

476001–476100 

|-bgcolor=#E9E9E9
| 476001 ||  || — || September 9, 2007 || Mount Lemmon || Mount Lemmon Survey || — || align=right | 1.5 km || 
|-id=002 bgcolor=#E9E9E9
| 476002 ||  || — || September 9, 2007 || Mount Lemmon || Mount Lemmon Survey || — || align=right | 1.3 km || 
|-id=003 bgcolor=#FA8072
| 476003 ||  || — || September 9, 2007 || Anderson Mesa || LONEOS || — || align=right | 1.6 km || 
|-id=004 bgcolor=#E9E9E9
| 476004 ||  || — || August 23, 2007 || Kitt Peak || Spacewatch || — || align=right | 1.8 km || 
|-id=005 bgcolor=#E9E9E9
| 476005 ||  || — || September 10, 2007 || Mount Lemmon || Mount Lemmon Survey || — || align=right | 1.3 km || 
|-id=006 bgcolor=#E9E9E9
| 476006 ||  || — || September 10, 2007 || Mount Lemmon || Mount Lemmon Survey || — || align=right | 1.2 km || 
|-id=007 bgcolor=#E9E9E9
| 476007 ||  || — || September 10, 2007 || Mount Lemmon || Mount Lemmon Survey || — || align=right | 1.8 km || 
|-id=008 bgcolor=#E9E9E9
| 476008 ||  || — || September 10, 2007 || Mount Lemmon || Mount Lemmon Survey || — || align=right | 1.6 km || 
|-id=009 bgcolor=#E9E9E9
| 476009 ||  || — || September 10, 2007 || Kitt Peak || Spacewatch || — || align=right | 1.8 km || 
|-id=010 bgcolor=#E9E9E9
| 476010 ||  || — || September 10, 2007 || Mount Lemmon || Mount Lemmon Survey ||  || align=right | 2.2 km || 
|-id=011 bgcolor=#E9E9E9
| 476011 ||  || — || September 10, 2007 || Kitt Peak || Spacewatch || — || align=right | 2.0 km || 
|-id=012 bgcolor=#E9E9E9
| 476012 ||  || — || September 11, 2007 || Mount Lemmon || Mount Lemmon Survey || — || align=right | 2.1 km || 
|-id=013 bgcolor=#E9E9E9
| 476013 ||  || — || September 12, 2007 || Mount Lemmon || Mount Lemmon Survey || — || align=right | 1.4 km || 
|-id=014 bgcolor=#E9E9E9
| 476014 ||  || — || September 13, 2007 || Hibiscus || N. Teamo || — || align=right | 1.5 km || 
|-id=015 bgcolor=#E9E9E9
| 476015 ||  || — || September 11, 2007 || Purple Mountain || PMO NEO || — || align=right | 2.2 km || 
|-id=016 bgcolor=#E9E9E9
| 476016 ||  || — || September 14, 2007 || Mount Lemmon || Mount Lemmon Survey || — || align=right | 1.8 km || 
|-id=017 bgcolor=#E9E9E9
| 476017 ||  || — || September 11, 2007 || XuYi || PMO NEO || — || align=right | 1.8 km || 
|-id=018 bgcolor=#E9E9E9
| 476018 ||  || — || September 12, 2007 || Mount Lemmon || Mount Lemmon Survey || — || align=right | 1.4 km || 
|-id=019 bgcolor=#E9E9E9
| 476019 ||  || — || August 10, 2007 || Kitt Peak || Spacewatch || — || align=right | 1.5 km || 
|-id=020 bgcolor=#E9E9E9
| 476020 ||  || — || September 10, 2007 || Kitt Peak || Spacewatch || — || align=right | 1.8 km || 
|-id=021 bgcolor=#E9E9E9
| 476021 ||  || — || September 10, 2007 || Kitt Peak || Spacewatch || — || align=right | 1.2 km || 
|-id=022 bgcolor=#E9E9E9
| 476022 ||  || — || September 11, 2007 || Kitt Peak || Spacewatch || — || align=right | 1.2 km || 
|-id=023 bgcolor=#E9E9E9
| 476023 ||  || — || September 12, 2007 || Catalina || CSS || — || align=right | 2.4 km || 
|-id=024 bgcolor=#E9E9E9
| 476024 ||  || — || September 12, 2007 || Kitt Peak || Spacewatch || — || align=right | 1.7 km || 
|-id=025 bgcolor=#E9E9E9
| 476025 ||  || — || September 9, 2007 || Mount Lemmon || Mount Lemmon Survey || — || align=right | 1.2 km || 
|-id=026 bgcolor=#E9E9E9
| 476026 ||  || — || September 13, 2007 || Kitt Peak || Spacewatch || — || align=right | 1.9 km || 
|-id=027 bgcolor=#E9E9E9
| 476027 ||  || — || September 10, 2007 || Kitt Peak || Spacewatch || — || align=right | 1.9 km || 
|-id=028 bgcolor=#d6d6d6
| 476028 ||  || — || September 14, 2007 || Mount Lemmon || Mount Lemmon Survey || — || align=right | 4.4 km || 
|-id=029 bgcolor=#E9E9E9
| 476029 ||  || — || September 11, 2007 || Kitt Peak || Spacewatch || — || align=right | 1.4 km || 
|-id=030 bgcolor=#E9E9E9
| 476030 ||  || — || September 11, 2007 || XuYi || PMO NEO || — || align=right | 2.1 km || 
|-id=031 bgcolor=#E9E9E9
| 476031 ||  || — || September 12, 2007 || Mount Lemmon || Mount Lemmon Survey || — || align=right | 1.5 km || 
|-id=032 bgcolor=#E9E9E9
| 476032 ||  || — || September 12, 2007 || Mount Lemmon || Mount Lemmon Survey || MIS || align=right | 2.0 km || 
|-id=033 bgcolor=#E9E9E9
| 476033 ||  || — || September 13, 2007 || Catalina || CSS || — || align=right | 2.3 km || 
|-id=034 bgcolor=#E9E9E9
| 476034 ||  || — || September 10, 2007 || Kitt Peak || Spacewatch || — || align=right | 1.8 km || 
|-id=035 bgcolor=#E9E9E9
| 476035 ||  || — || September 15, 2007 || Mount Lemmon || Mount Lemmon Survey || — || align=right | 1.2 km || 
|-id=036 bgcolor=#E9E9E9
| 476036 ||  || — || September 10, 2007 || Kitt Peak || Spacewatch || — || align=right | 2.2 km || 
|-id=037 bgcolor=#E9E9E9
| 476037 ||  || — || September 15, 2007 || Kitt Peak || Spacewatch || — || align=right | 1.5 km || 
|-id=038 bgcolor=#E9E9E9
| 476038 ||  || — || September 15, 2007 || Kitt Peak || Spacewatch || — || align=right | 2.0 km || 
|-id=039 bgcolor=#E9E9E9
| 476039 ||  || — || September 13, 2007 || Catalina || CSS || — || align=right | 1.3 km || 
|-id=040 bgcolor=#E9E9E9
| 476040 ||  || — || September 13, 2007 || Catalina || CSS || — || align=right | 2.8 km || 
|-id=041 bgcolor=#E9E9E9
| 476041 ||  || — || September 13, 2007 || Catalina || CSS || EUN || align=right | 1.6 km || 
|-id=042 bgcolor=#E9E9E9
| 476042 ||  || — || September 2, 2007 || Catalina || CSS || — || align=right | 1.6 km || 
|-id=043 bgcolor=#E9E9E9
| 476043 ||  || — || September 9, 2007 || Mount Lemmon || Mount Lemmon Survey ||  || align=right | 1.6 km || 
|-id=044 bgcolor=#E9E9E9
| 476044 ||  || — || September 10, 2007 || Mount Lemmon || Mount Lemmon Survey || — || align=right | 1.9 km || 
|-id=045 bgcolor=#E9E9E9
| 476045 ||  || — || September 12, 2007 || Catalina || CSS || — || align=right | 1.7 km || 
|-id=046 bgcolor=#E9E9E9
| 476046 ||  || — || September 13, 2007 || Anderson Mesa || LONEOS || — || align=right | 1.4 km || 
|-id=047 bgcolor=#E9E9E9
| 476047 ||  || — || September 10, 2007 || Mount Lemmon || Mount Lemmon Survey || — || align=right | 1.6 km || 
|-id=048 bgcolor=#E9E9E9
| 476048 ||  || — || September 15, 2007 || Mount Lemmon || Mount Lemmon Survey || — || align=right | 2.0 km || 
|-id=049 bgcolor=#E9E9E9
| 476049 ||  || — || September 12, 2007 || Mount Lemmon || Mount Lemmon Survey || — || align=right | 2.3 km || 
|-id=050 bgcolor=#E9E9E9
| 476050 ||  || — || September 13, 2007 || Mount Lemmon || Mount Lemmon Survey || — || align=right | 1.7 km || 
|-id=051 bgcolor=#E9E9E9
| 476051 ||  || — || September 12, 2007 || Mount Lemmon || Mount Lemmon Survey || — || align=right | 2.0 km || 
|-id=052 bgcolor=#E9E9E9
| 476052 ||  || — || September 12, 2007 || Mount Lemmon || Mount Lemmon Survey || — || align=right | 1.4 km || 
|-id=053 bgcolor=#E9E9E9
| 476053 ||  || — || September 3, 2007 || Catalina || CSS || — || align=right | 3.8 km || 
|-id=054 bgcolor=#E9E9E9
| 476054 ||  || — || September 5, 2007 || Anderson Mesa || LONEOS || GEF || align=right | 1.3 km || 
|-id=055 bgcolor=#E9E9E9
| 476055 ||  || — || September 10, 2007 || Mount Lemmon || Mount Lemmon Survey || — || align=right | 1.8 km || 
|-id=056 bgcolor=#E9E9E9
| 476056 ||  || — || September 11, 2007 || Kitt Peak || Spacewatch || — || align=right | 1.2 km || 
|-id=057 bgcolor=#E9E9E9
| 476057 ||  || — || September 13, 2007 || Socorro || LINEAR || DOR || align=right | 2.1 km || 
|-id=058 bgcolor=#E9E9E9
| 476058 ||  || — || September 15, 2007 || Socorro || LINEAR || — || align=right | 2.3 km || 
|-id=059 bgcolor=#E9E9E9
| 476059 ||  || — || September 11, 2007 || Catalina || CSS || — || align=right | 2.1 km || 
|-id=060 bgcolor=#d6d6d6
| 476060 ||  || — || September 13, 2007 || Mount Lemmon || Mount Lemmon Survey || — || align=right | 2.1 km || 
|-id=061 bgcolor=#E9E9E9
| 476061 ||  || — || September 14, 2007 || Mount Lemmon || Mount Lemmon Survey || — || align=right | 1.7 km || 
|-id=062 bgcolor=#E9E9E9
| 476062 ||  || — || September 18, 2007 || Anderson Mesa || LONEOS || — || align=right | 1.5 km || 
|-id=063 bgcolor=#E9E9E9
| 476063 ||  || — || September 15, 2007 || Kitt Peak || Spacewatch || — || align=right | 2.0 km || 
|-id=064 bgcolor=#E9E9E9
| 476064 ||  || — || September 15, 2007 || Kitt Peak || Spacewatch || — || align=right | 1.5 km || 
|-id=065 bgcolor=#E9E9E9
| 476065 ||  || — || September 20, 2007 || Lulin || LUSS || — || align=right | 2.0 km || 
|-id=066 bgcolor=#E9E9E9
| 476066 ||  || — || September 18, 2007 || Catalina || CSS || — || align=right | 2.7 km || 
|-id=067 bgcolor=#E9E9E9
| 476067 ||  || — || September 25, 2007 || Mount Lemmon || Mount Lemmon Survey || — || align=right | 2.0 km || 
|-id=068 bgcolor=#E9E9E9
| 476068 ||  || — || September 20, 2007 || Catalina || CSS || ADE || align=right | 2.0 km || 
|-id=069 bgcolor=#E9E9E9
| 476069 ||  || — || September 17, 2007 || Socorro || LINEAR || — || align=right | 2.4 km || 
|-id=070 bgcolor=#E9E9E9
| 476070 ||  || — || September 18, 2007 || Kitt Peak || Spacewatch || — || align=right | 2.6 km || 
|-id=071 bgcolor=#E9E9E9
| 476071 ||  || — || October 6, 2007 || Prairie Grass || J. Mahony || HOF || align=right | 2.6 km || 
|-id=072 bgcolor=#E9E9E9
| 476072 ||  || — || October 6, 2007 || Bergisch Gladbach || W. Bickel || — || align=right | 1.9 km || 
|-id=073 bgcolor=#E9E9E9
| 476073 ||  || — || September 25, 2007 || Mount Lemmon || Mount Lemmon Survey || — || align=right | 2.4 km || 
|-id=074 bgcolor=#E9E9E9
| 476074 ||  || — || September 13, 2007 || Catalina || CSS || — || align=right | 1.9 km || 
|-id=075 bgcolor=#E9E9E9
| 476075 ||  || — || October 7, 2007 || Kitt Peak || Spacewatch || — || align=right | 2.8 km || 
|-id=076 bgcolor=#E9E9E9
| 476076 ||  || — || October 4, 2007 || Kitt Peak || Spacewatch || — || align=right | 1.6 km || 
|-id=077 bgcolor=#E9E9E9
| 476077 ||  || — || October 4, 2007 || Kitt Peak || Spacewatch || — || align=right | 2.4 km || 
|-id=078 bgcolor=#E9E9E9
| 476078 ||  || — || October 4, 2007 || Kitt Peak || Spacewatch || — || align=right | 2.0 km || 
|-id=079 bgcolor=#E9E9E9
| 476079 ||  || — || October 4, 2007 || Kitt Peak || Spacewatch || HOF || align=right | 2.2 km || 
|-id=080 bgcolor=#E9E9E9
| 476080 ||  || — || October 7, 2007 || Catalina || CSS || — || align=right | 2.3 km || 
|-id=081 bgcolor=#E9E9E9
| 476081 ||  || — || September 25, 2007 || Mount Lemmon || Mount Lemmon Survey || — || align=right | 2.0 km || 
|-id=082 bgcolor=#E9E9E9
| 476082 ||  || — || October 7, 2007 || Kitt Peak || Spacewatch || — || align=right | 2.1 km || 
|-id=083 bgcolor=#E9E9E9
| 476083 ||  || — || October 4, 2007 || Kitt Peak || Spacewatch || — || align=right | 1.6 km || 
|-id=084 bgcolor=#E9E9E9
| 476084 ||  || — || October 4, 2007 || Kitt Peak || Spacewatch || — || align=right | 2.4 km || 
|-id=085 bgcolor=#E9E9E9
| 476085 ||  || — || October 4, 2007 || Kitt Peak || Spacewatch || — || align=right | 1.2 km || 
|-id=086 bgcolor=#E9E9E9
| 476086 ||  || — || October 4, 2007 || Kitt Peak || Spacewatch || — || align=right | 2.1 km || 
|-id=087 bgcolor=#E9E9E9
| 476087 ||  || — || October 4, 2007 || Kitt Peak || Spacewatch || — || align=right | 2.1 km || 
|-id=088 bgcolor=#E9E9E9
| 476088 ||  || — || October 4, 2007 || Kitt Peak || Spacewatch || — || align=right | 2.0 km || 
|-id=089 bgcolor=#E9E9E9
| 476089 ||  || — || October 4, 2007 || Kitt Peak || Spacewatch || — || align=right | 2.1 km || 
|-id=090 bgcolor=#E9E9E9
| 476090 ||  || — || October 6, 2007 || Kitt Peak || Spacewatch ||  || align=right | 2.1 km || 
|-id=091 bgcolor=#d6d6d6
| 476091 ||  || — || October 7, 2007 || Mount Lemmon || Mount Lemmon Survey || KOR || align=right | 1.1 km || 
|-id=092 bgcolor=#E9E9E9
| 476092 ||  || — || October 7, 2007 || Mount Lemmon || Mount Lemmon Survey || — || align=right | 1.8 km || 
|-id=093 bgcolor=#FFC2E0
| 476093 ||  || — || October 12, 2007 || Catalina || CSS || APOcritical || align=right data-sort-value="0.45" | 450 m || 
|-id=094 bgcolor=#E9E9E9
| 476094 ||  || — || October 4, 2007 || Kitt Peak || Spacewatch || — || align=right | 1.5 km || 
|-id=095 bgcolor=#E9E9E9
| 476095 ||  || — || October 8, 2007 || Mount Lemmon || Mount Lemmon Survey || — || align=right | 1.5 km || 
|-id=096 bgcolor=#E9E9E9
| 476096 ||  || — || October 8, 2007 || Mount Lemmon || Mount Lemmon Survey || — || align=right | 2.2 km || 
|-id=097 bgcolor=#E9E9E9
| 476097 ||  || — || October 8, 2007 || Anderson Mesa || LONEOS || DOR || align=right | 2.2 km || 
|-id=098 bgcolor=#E9E9E9
| 476098 ||  || — || October 8, 2007 || Anderson Mesa || LONEOS || — || align=right | 2.5 km || 
|-id=099 bgcolor=#E9E9E9
| 476099 ||  || — || October 6, 2007 || Kitt Peak || Spacewatch || — || align=right | 1.3 km || 
|-id=100 bgcolor=#E9E9E9
| 476100 ||  || — || October 6, 2007 || Kitt Peak || Spacewatch || — || align=right | 1.8 km || 
|}

476101–476200 

|-bgcolor=#E9E9E9
| 476101 ||  || — || September 9, 2007 || Mount Lemmon || Mount Lemmon Survey || — || align=right | 1.7 km || 
|-id=102 bgcolor=#E9E9E9
| 476102 ||  || — || October 6, 2007 || Kitt Peak || Spacewatch || HOF || align=right | 2.3 km || 
|-id=103 bgcolor=#E9E9E9
| 476103 ||  || — || September 13, 2007 || Catalina || CSS || — || align=right | 2.6 km || 
|-id=104 bgcolor=#E9E9E9
| 476104 ||  || — || October 6, 2007 || Socorro || LINEAR || — || align=right | 2.1 km || 
|-id=105 bgcolor=#E9E9E9
| 476105 ||  || — || September 12, 2007 || Mount Lemmon || Mount Lemmon Survey || AEO || align=right | 1.1 km || 
|-id=106 bgcolor=#E9E9E9
| 476106 ||  || — || October 5, 2007 || Kitt Peak || Spacewatch || — || align=right | 2.0 km || 
|-id=107 bgcolor=#E9E9E9
| 476107 ||  || — || September 5, 2007 || Mount Lemmon || Mount Lemmon Survey || — || align=right | 3.2 km || 
|-id=108 bgcolor=#E9E9E9
| 476108 ||  || — || October 9, 2007 || Socorro || LINEAR || JUN || align=right | 1.1 km || 
|-id=109 bgcolor=#E9E9E9
| 476109 ||  || — || September 12, 2007 || Mount Lemmon || Mount Lemmon Survey || critical || align=right | 2.3 km || 
|-id=110 bgcolor=#E9E9E9
| 476110 ||  || — || October 9, 2007 || Socorro || LINEAR || — || align=right | 1.7 km || 
|-id=111 bgcolor=#E9E9E9
| 476111 ||  || — || September 14, 2007 || Mount Lemmon || Mount Lemmon Survey || JUN || align=right data-sort-value="0.99" | 990 m || 
|-id=112 bgcolor=#E9E9E9
| 476112 ||  || — || October 12, 2007 || Socorro || LINEAR || — || align=right | 1.7 km || 
|-id=113 bgcolor=#E9E9E9
| 476113 ||  || — || October 10, 2007 || Mount Lemmon || Mount Lemmon Survey || — || align=right | 2.1 km || 
|-id=114 bgcolor=#E9E9E9
| 476114 ||  || — || September 15, 2007 || Mount Lemmon || Mount Lemmon Survey || — || align=right | 2.4 km || 
|-id=115 bgcolor=#E9E9E9
| 476115 ||  || — || October 7, 2007 || Catalina || CSS || — || align=right | 2.3 km || 
|-id=116 bgcolor=#E9E9E9
| 476116 ||  || — || October 13, 2007 || Socorro || LINEAR || — || align=right | 1.9 km || 
|-id=117 bgcolor=#E9E9E9
| 476117 ||  || — || October 6, 2007 || Kitt Peak || Spacewatch || HOF || align=right | 2.2 km || 
|-id=118 bgcolor=#E9E9E9
| 476118 ||  || — || October 8, 2007 || Kitt Peak || Spacewatch || — || align=right | 2.8 km || 
|-id=119 bgcolor=#E9E9E9
| 476119 ||  || — || October 8, 2007 || Mount Lemmon || Mount Lemmon Survey || — || align=right | 1.7 km || 
|-id=120 bgcolor=#E9E9E9
| 476120 ||  || — || October 7, 2007 || Kitt Peak || Spacewatch || — || align=right | 2.2 km || 
|-id=121 bgcolor=#E9E9E9
| 476121 ||  || — || September 25, 2007 || Mount Lemmon || Mount Lemmon Survey || EUN || align=right | 1.4 km || 
|-id=122 bgcolor=#E9E9E9
| 476122 ||  || — || October 7, 2007 || Kitt Peak || Spacewatch || — || align=right | 2.1 km || 
|-id=123 bgcolor=#E9E9E9
| 476123 ||  || — || October 7, 2007 || Kitt Peak || Spacewatch || — || align=right | 1.7 km || 
|-id=124 bgcolor=#E9E9E9
| 476124 ||  || — || September 14, 2007 || Mount Lemmon || Mount Lemmon Survey || — || align=right | 1.7 km || 
|-id=125 bgcolor=#E9E9E9
| 476125 ||  || — || October 11, 2007 || Mount Lemmon || Mount Lemmon Survey || — || align=right | 1.7 km || 
|-id=126 bgcolor=#E9E9E9
| 476126 ||  || — || September 12, 2007 || Mount Lemmon || Mount Lemmon Survey || — || align=right | 2.2 km || 
|-id=127 bgcolor=#E9E9E9
| 476127 ||  || — || October 16, 1998 || Kitt Peak || Spacewatch || EUN || align=right data-sort-value="0.86" | 860 m || 
|-id=128 bgcolor=#E9E9E9
| 476128 ||  || — || October 8, 2007 || Kitt Peak || Spacewatch || — || align=right | 1.8 km || 
|-id=129 bgcolor=#E9E9E9
| 476129 ||  || — || October 8, 2007 || Kitt Peak || Spacewatch || — || align=right | 2.0 km || 
|-id=130 bgcolor=#E9E9E9
| 476130 ||  || — || October 8, 2007 || Catalina || CSS || — || align=right | 2.4 km || 
|-id=131 bgcolor=#E9E9E9
| 476131 ||  || — || October 8, 2007 || Kitt Peak || Spacewatch || — || align=right | 1.8 km || 
|-id=132 bgcolor=#E9E9E9
| 476132 ||  || — || October 9, 2007 || Mount Lemmon || Mount Lemmon Survey || — || align=right | 1.9 km || 
|-id=133 bgcolor=#E9E9E9
| 476133 ||  || — || September 5, 2007 || Catalina || CSS || — || align=right | 2.4 km || 
|-id=134 bgcolor=#E9E9E9
| 476134 ||  || — || October 7, 2007 || Mount Lemmon || Mount Lemmon Survey || — || align=right | 2.3 km || 
|-id=135 bgcolor=#E9E9E9
| 476135 ||  || — || September 3, 2007 || Catalina || CSS || — || align=right | 1.7 km || 
|-id=136 bgcolor=#E9E9E9
| 476136 ||  || — || October 11, 2007 || Mount Lemmon || Mount Lemmon Survey || — || align=right | 2.0 km || 
|-id=137 bgcolor=#E9E9E9
| 476137 ||  || — || October 11, 2007 || Kitt Peak || Spacewatch || — || align=right | 1.4 km || 
|-id=138 bgcolor=#E9E9E9
| 476138 ||  || — || October 11, 2007 || Mount Lemmon || Mount Lemmon Survey || — || align=right | 2.1 km || 
|-id=139 bgcolor=#E9E9E9
| 476139 ||  || — || September 10, 2007 || Mount Lemmon || Mount Lemmon Survey || — || align=right | 2.3 km || 
|-id=140 bgcolor=#E9E9E9
| 476140 ||  || — || October 9, 2007 || Kitt Peak || Spacewatch || — || align=right | 2.3 km || 
|-id=141 bgcolor=#E9E9E9
| 476141 ||  || — || October 11, 2007 || Catalina || CSS || AEO || align=right | 1.1 km || 
|-id=142 bgcolor=#E9E9E9
| 476142 ||  || — || September 9, 2007 || Kitt Peak || Spacewatch || — || align=right | 1.4 km || 
|-id=143 bgcolor=#E9E9E9
| 476143 ||  || — || September 20, 2007 || Kitt Peak || Spacewatch || — || align=right | 2.0 km || 
|-id=144 bgcolor=#E9E9E9
| 476144 ||  || — || October 10, 2007 || Mount Lemmon || Mount Lemmon Survey || — || align=right | 2.1 km || 
|-id=145 bgcolor=#E9E9E9
| 476145 ||  || — || August 10, 2007 || Kitt Peak || Spacewatch || — || align=right | 1.6 km || 
|-id=146 bgcolor=#E9E9E9
| 476146 ||  || — || October 9, 2007 || Mount Lemmon || Mount Lemmon Survey || — || align=right | 2.5 km || 
|-id=147 bgcolor=#E9E9E9
| 476147 ||  || — || September 12, 2007 || Catalina || CSS || — || align=right | 2.0 km || 
|-id=148 bgcolor=#E9E9E9
| 476148 ||  || — || October 13, 2007 || Catalina || CSS || — || align=right | 1.9 km || 
|-id=149 bgcolor=#E9E9E9
| 476149 ||  || — || October 11, 2007 || Kitt Peak || Spacewatch || — || align=right | 2.9 km || 
|-id=150 bgcolor=#E9E9E9
| 476150 ||  || — || October 11, 2007 || Kitt Peak || Spacewatch || — || align=right | 2.0 km || 
|-id=151 bgcolor=#E9E9E9
| 476151 ||  || — || October 11, 2007 || Kitt Peak || Spacewatch || — || align=right | 1.8 km || 
|-id=152 bgcolor=#E9E9E9
| 476152 ||  || — || October 11, 2007 || Kitt Peak || Spacewatch || — || align=right | 1.8 km || 
|-id=153 bgcolor=#E9E9E9
| 476153 ||  || — || October 11, 2007 || Kitt Peak || Spacewatch || AGN || align=right | 1.1 km || 
|-id=154 bgcolor=#d6d6d6
| 476154 ||  || — || October 11, 2007 || Kitt Peak || Spacewatch || — || align=right | 2.9 km || 
|-id=155 bgcolor=#E9E9E9
| 476155 ||  || — || October 10, 2007 || Mount Lemmon || Mount Lemmon Survey || — || align=right | 2.0 km || 
|-id=156 bgcolor=#E9E9E9
| 476156 ||  || — || September 18, 2007 || Kitt Peak || Spacewatch || — || align=right | 2.3 km || 
|-id=157 bgcolor=#E9E9E9
| 476157 ||  || — || September 5, 2007 || Catalina || CSS || — || align=right | 1.8 km || 
|-id=158 bgcolor=#E9E9E9
| 476158 ||  || — || October 14, 2007 || Mount Lemmon || Mount Lemmon Survey || AEO || align=right | 1.0 km || 
|-id=159 bgcolor=#E9E9E9
| 476159 ||  || — || October 15, 2007 || Mount Lemmon || Mount Lemmon Survey || — || align=right | 2.6 km || 
|-id=160 bgcolor=#d6d6d6
| 476160 ||  || — || October 10, 2007 || Mount Lemmon || Mount Lemmon Survey || — || align=right | 2.1 km || 
|-id=161 bgcolor=#E9E9E9
| 476161 ||  || — || October 12, 2007 || Mount Lemmon || Mount Lemmon Survey || — || align=right | 2.2 km || 
|-id=162 bgcolor=#E9E9E9
| 476162 ||  || — || October 14, 2007 || Bergisch Gladbach || W. Bickel || — || align=right | 2.1 km || 
|-id=163 bgcolor=#E9E9E9
| 476163 ||  || — || October 13, 2007 || Catalina || CSS || — || align=right | 2.1 km || 
|-id=164 bgcolor=#E9E9E9
| 476164 ||  || — || October 6, 2007 || Kitt Peak || Spacewatch || AGN || align=right | 1.1 km || 
|-id=165 bgcolor=#E9E9E9
| 476165 ||  || — || October 14, 2007 || Mount Lemmon || Mount Lemmon Survey || DOR || align=right | 2.2 km || 
|-id=166 bgcolor=#E9E9E9
| 476166 ||  || — || October 14, 2007 || Mount Lemmon || Mount Lemmon Survey || — || align=right | 2.3 km || 
|-id=167 bgcolor=#E9E9E9
| 476167 ||  || — || October 15, 2007 || Catalina || CSS || — || align=right | 1.5 km || 
|-id=168 bgcolor=#E9E9E9
| 476168 ||  || — || October 15, 2007 || Kitt Peak || Spacewatch || — || align=right | 1.9 km || 
|-id=169 bgcolor=#E9E9E9
| 476169 ||  || — || October 15, 2007 || Mount Lemmon || Mount Lemmon Survey || — || align=right | 1.9 km || 
|-id=170 bgcolor=#E9E9E9
| 476170 ||  || — || October 10, 2007 || Catalina || CSS || — || align=right | 2.4 km || 
|-id=171 bgcolor=#E9E9E9
| 476171 ||  || — || September 20, 2007 || Catalina || CSS || — || align=right | 1.9 km || 
|-id=172 bgcolor=#E9E9E9
| 476172 ||  || — || October 8, 2007 || Kitt Peak || Spacewatch || — || align=right | 1.6 km || 
|-id=173 bgcolor=#E9E9E9
| 476173 ||  || — || October 10, 2007 || Kitt Peak || Spacewatch || — || align=right | 2.1 km || 
|-id=174 bgcolor=#E9E9E9
| 476174 ||  || — || October 10, 2007 || Kitt Peak || Spacewatch || — || align=right | 1.8 km || 
|-id=175 bgcolor=#E9E9E9
| 476175 ||  || — || October 12, 2007 || Kitt Peak || Spacewatch || — || align=right | 2.4 km || 
|-id=176 bgcolor=#E9E9E9
| 476176 ||  || — || October 4, 2007 || Kitt Peak || Spacewatch || — || align=right | 1.6 km || 
|-id=177 bgcolor=#E9E9E9
| 476177 ||  || — || October 4, 2007 || Kitt Peak || Spacewatch || AGN || align=right data-sort-value="0.97" | 970 m || 
|-id=178 bgcolor=#E9E9E9
| 476178 ||  || — || October 7, 2007 || Mount Lemmon || Mount Lemmon Survey || — || align=right | 2.3 km || 
|-id=179 bgcolor=#E9E9E9
| 476179 ||  || — || October 15, 2007 || Mount Lemmon || Mount Lemmon Survey || — || align=right | 2.0 km || 
|-id=180 bgcolor=#E9E9E9
| 476180 ||  || — || September 25, 2007 || Mount Lemmon || Mount Lemmon Survey || — || align=right | 2.3 km || 
|-id=181 bgcolor=#E9E9E9
| 476181 ||  || — || October 13, 2007 || Socorro || LINEAR || — || align=right | 1.7 km || 
|-id=182 bgcolor=#d6d6d6
| 476182 ||  || — || October 10, 2007 || Mount Lemmon || Mount Lemmon Survey || — || align=right | 2.0 km || 
|-id=183 bgcolor=#E9E9E9
| 476183 ||  || — || October 10, 2007 || Kitt Peak || Spacewatch || AGN || align=right | 1.3 km || 
|-id=184 bgcolor=#E9E9E9
| 476184 ||  || — || October 12, 2007 || Socorro || LINEAR || — || align=right | 2.5 km || 
|-id=185 bgcolor=#E9E9E9
| 476185 ||  || — || October 9, 2007 || Kitt Peak || Spacewatch || DOR || align=right | 2.2 km || 
|-id=186 bgcolor=#E9E9E9
| 476186 ||  || — || October 16, 2007 || Catalina || CSS || — || align=right | 1.9 km || 
|-id=187 bgcolor=#FFC2E0
| 476187 ||  || — || October 30, 2007 || Mount Lemmon || Mount Lemmon Survey || APO || align=right data-sort-value="0.36" | 360 m || 
|-id=188 bgcolor=#E9E9E9
| 476188 ||  || — || October 18, 2007 || Kitt Peak || Spacewatch || HOF || align=right | 2.6 km || 
|-id=189 bgcolor=#E9E9E9
| 476189 ||  || — || October 8, 2007 || Mount Lemmon || Mount Lemmon Survey || AEO || align=right | 1.1 km || 
|-id=190 bgcolor=#E9E9E9
| 476190 ||  || — || October 16, 2007 || Mount Lemmon || Mount Lemmon Survey || — || align=right | 2.1 km || 
|-id=191 bgcolor=#E9E9E9
| 476191 ||  || — || October 16, 2007 || Kitt Peak || Spacewatch || — || align=right | 1.9 km || 
|-id=192 bgcolor=#E9E9E9
| 476192 ||  || — || October 8, 2007 || Kitt Peak || Spacewatch || — || align=right | 2.2 km || 
|-id=193 bgcolor=#E9E9E9
| 476193 ||  || — || October 16, 2007 || Kitt Peak || Spacewatch || NEM || align=right | 1.9 km || 
|-id=194 bgcolor=#E9E9E9
| 476194 ||  || — || October 16, 2007 || Kitt Peak || Spacewatch || HOF || align=right | 2.1 km || 
|-id=195 bgcolor=#E9E9E9
| 476195 ||  || — || September 12, 2007 || Mount Lemmon || Mount Lemmon Survey || GEF || align=right | 1.3 km || 
|-id=196 bgcolor=#E9E9E9
| 476196 ||  || — || October 18, 2007 || Kitt Peak || Spacewatch || AGN || align=right | 1.1 km || 
|-id=197 bgcolor=#E9E9E9
| 476197 ||  || — || October 19, 2007 || Kitt Peak || Spacewatch || — || align=right | 2.1 km || 
|-id=198 bgcolor=#E9E9E9
| 476198 ||  || — || October 20, 2007 || Catalina || CSS || — || align=right | 2.2 km || 
|-id=199 bgcolor=#E9E9E9
| 476199 ||  || — || October 24, 2007 || Mount Lemmon || Mount Lemmon Survey || — || align=right | 2.7 km || 
|-id=200 bgcolor=#E9E9E9
| 476200 ||  || — || October 7, 2007 || Kitt Peak || Spacewatch || — || align=right | 1.8 km || 
|}

476201–476300 

|-bgcolor=#E9E9E9
| 476201 ||  || — || October 30, 2007 || Mount Lemmon || Mount Lemmon Survey || critical || align=right | 1.2 km || 
|-id=202 bgcolor=#E9E9E9
| 476202 ||  || — || October 10, 2007 || Kitt Peak || Spacewatch || AEO || align=right data-sort-value="0.90" | 900 m || 
|-id=203 bgcolor=#E9E9E9
| 476203 ||  || — || September 18, 2007 || Mount Lemmon || Mount Lemmon Survey || — || align=right | 1.8 km || 
|-id=204 bgcolor=#E9E9E9
| 476204 ||  || — || October 30, 2007 || Mount Lemmon || Mount Lemmon Survey || — || align=right | 1.2 km || 
|-id=205 bgcolor=#E9E9E9
| 476205 ||  || — || October 18, 2007 || Kitt Peak || Spacewatch || — || align=right | 2.4 km || 
|-id=206 bgcolor=#E9E9E9
| 476206 ||  || — || October 21, 2007 || Kitt Peak || Spacewatch || — || align=right | 1.9 km || 
|-id=207 bgcolor=#E9E9E9
| 476207 ||  || — || October 17, 2007 || Mount Lemmon || Mount Lemmon Survey || ADE || align=right | 2.2 km || 
|-id=208 bgcolor=#E9E9E9
| 476208 ||  || — || October 30, 2007 || Kitt Peak || Spacewatch || — || align=right | 2.4 km || 
|-id=209 bgcolor=#E9E9E9
| 476209 ||  || — || October 30, 2007 || Mount Lemmon || Mount Lemmon Survey || — || align=right | 1.6 km || 
|-id=210 bgcolor=#d6d6d6
| 476210 ||  || — || October 18, 2007 || Kitt Peak || Spacewatch || KOR || align=right | 1.1 km || 
|-id=211 bgcolor=#d6d6d6
| 476211 ||  || — || October 31, 2007 || Mount Lemmon || Mount Lemmon Survey || — || align=right | 2.0 km || 
|-id=212 bgcolor=#E9E9E9
| 476212 ||  || — || October 30, 2007 || Mount Lemmon || Mount Lemmon Survey || — || align=right | 1.9 km || 
|-id=213 bgcolor=#E9E9E9
| 476213 ||  || — || October 30, 2007 || Mount Lemmon || Mount Lemmon Survey || AGN || align=right | 1.0 km || 
|-id=214 bgcolor=#E9E9E9
| 476214 ||  || — || October 30, 2007 || Mount Lemmon || Mount Lemmon Survey || HOF || align=right | 2.3 km || 
|-id=215 bgcolor=#E9E9E9
| 476215 ||  || — || October 30, 2007 || Kitt Peak || Spacewatch || fast || align=right | 1.8 km || 
|-id=216 bgcolor=#E9E9E9
| 476216 ||  || — || October 30, 2007 || Mount Lemmon || Mount Lemmon Survey || HOF || align=right | 2.3 km || 
|-id=217 bgcolor=#E9E9E9
| 476217 ||  || — || October 4, 2007 || Kitt Peak || Spacewatch || — || align=right | 2.0 km || 
|-id=218 bgcolor=#E9E9E9
| 476218 ||  || — || October 31, 2007 || Kitt Peak || Spacewatch || — || align=right | 2.1 km || 
|-id=219 bgcolor=#E9E9E9
| 476219 ||  || — || October 10, 2007 || Catalina || CSS || — || align=right | 1.8 km || 
|-id=220 bgcolor=#E9E9E9
| 476220 ||  || — || October 21, 2007 || Mount Lemmon || Mount Lemmon Survey || — || align=right | 2.2 km || 
|-id=221 bgcolor=#E9E9E9
| 476221 ||  || — || October 16, 2007 || Catalina || CSS || JUN || align=right data-sort-value="0.88" | 880 m || 
|-id=222 bgcolor=#E9E9E9
| 476222 ||  || — || October 16, 2007 || Mount Lemmon || Mount Lemmon Survey || AGN || align=right | 1.0 km || 
|-id=223 bgcolor=#E9E9E9
| 476223 ||  || — || October 30, 2007 || Kitt Peak || Spacewatch || — || align=right | 1.9 km || 
|-id=224 bgcolor=#E9E9E9
| 476224 ||  || — || October 24, 2007 || Mount Lemmon || Mount Lemmon Survey || — || align=right | 2.0 km || 
|-id=225 bgcolor=#E9E9E9
| 476225 ||  || — || October 20, 2007 || Mount Lemmon || Mount Lemmon Survey || — || align=right | 2.3 km || 
|-id=226 bgcolor=#E9E9E9
| 476226 ||  || — || October 10, 2007 || Kitt Peak || Spacewatch || — || align=right | 1.5 km || 
|-id=227 bgcolor=#E9E9E9
| 476227 ||  || — || November 1, 2007 || Mount Lemmon || Mount Lemmon Survey || — || align=right | 1.7 km || 
|-id=228 bgcolor=#E9E9E9
| 476228 ||  || — || October 13, 2007 || Mount Lemmon || Mount Lemmon Survey || — || align=right | 1.8 km || 
|-id=229 bgcolor=#E9E9E9
| 476229 ||  || — || November 2, 2007 || Mount Lemmon || Mount Lemmon Survey || — || align=right | 1.9 km || 
|-id=230 bgcolor=#E9E9E9
| 476230 ||  || — || November 2, 2007 || Mount Lemmon || Mount Lemmon Survey || — || align=right | 2.2 km || 
|-id=231 bgcolor=#E9E9E9
| 476231 ||  || — || October 18, 2007 || Kitt Peak || Spacewatch || — || align=right | 1.9 km || 
|-id=232 bgcolor=#E9E9E9
| 476232 ||  || — || October 9, 2007 || Kitt Peak || Spacewatch || — || align=right | 1.5 km || 
|-id=233 bgcolor=#E9E9E9
| 476233 ||  || — || November 2, 2007 || Kitt Peak || Spacewatch || — || align=right | 2.1 km || 
|-id=234 bgcolor=#E9E9E9
| 476234 ||  || — || September 15, 2007 || Mount Lemmon || Mount Lemmon Survey ||  || align=right | 1.5 km || 
|-id=235 bgcolor=#E9E9E9
| 476235 ||  || — || October 20, 2007 || Mount Lemmon || Mount Lemmon Survey || — || align=right | 2.0 km || 
|-id=236 bgcolor=#E9E9E9
| 476236 ||  || — || October 10, 2007 || Kitt Peak || Spacewatch || — || align=right | 2.0 km || 
|-id=237 bgcolor=#E9E9E9
| 476237 ||  || — || October 18, 2007 || Kitt Peak || Spacewatch || AGN || align=right data-sort-value="0.97" | 970 m || 
|-id=238 bgcolor=#E9E9E9
| 476238 ||  || — || November 1, 2007 || Kitt Peak || Spacewatch || — || align=right | 2.1 km || 
|-id=239 bgcolor=#E9E9E9
| 476239 ||  || — || November 1, 2007 || Kitt Peak || Spacewatch || AGN || align=right | 1.2 km || 
|-id=240 bgcolor=#d6d6d6
| 476240 ||  || — || November 1, 2007 || Kitt Peak || Spacewatch || — || align=right | 1.9 km || 
|-id=241 bgcolor=#E9E9E9
| 476241 ||  || — || November 1, 2007 || Kitt Peak || Spacewatch || — || align=right | 2.3 km || 
|-id=242 bgcolor=#E9E9E9
| 476242 ||  || — || November 2, 2007 || Mount Lemmon || Mount Lemmon Survey ||  || align=right | 1.2 km || 
|-id=243 bgcolor=#E9E9E9
| 476243 ||  || — || September 14, 2007 || Mount Lemmon || Mount Lemmon Survey || — || align=right | 1.7 km || 
|-id=244 bgcolor=#E9E9E9
| 476244 ||  || — || November 3, 2007 || Kitt Peak || Spacewatch || — || align=right | 2.1 km || 
|-id=245 bgcolor=#E9E9E9
| 476245 ||  || — || September 14, 2007 || Mount Lemmon || Mount Lemmon Survey || HOF || align=right | 2.1 km || 
|-id=246 bgcolor=#E9E9E9
| 476246 ||  || — || November 3, 2007 || Kitt Peak || Spacewatch || — || align=right | 1.7 km || 
|-id=247 bgcolor=#d6d6d6
| 476247 ||  || — || October 12, 2007 || Kitt Peak || Spacewatch || — || align=right | 1.9 km || 
|-id=248 bgcolor=#E9E9E9
| 476248 ||  || — || October 8, 2007 || Kitt Peak || Spacewatch || AGN || align=right data-sort-value="0.88" | 880 m || 
|-id=249 bgcolor=#E9E9E9
| 476249 ||  || — || November 3, 2007 || Kitt Peak || Spacewatch || — || align=right | 1.8 km || 
|-id=250 bgcolor=#E9E9E9
| 476250 ||  || — || November 3, 2007 || Kitt Peak || Spacewatch || — || align=right | 2.0 km || 
|-id=251 bgcolor=#E9E9E9
| 476251 ||  || — || October 10, 2007 || Kitt Peak || Spacewatch || — || align=right | 1.8 km || 
|-id=252 bgcolor=#E9E9E9
| 476252 ||  || — || October 19, 2007 || Kitt Peak || Spacewatch || — || align=right | 2.2 km || 
|-id=253 bgcolor=#E9E9E9
| 476253 ||  || — || November 4, 2007 || Kitt Peak || Spacewatch || — || align=right | 1.9 km || 
|-id=254 bgcolor=#d6d6d6
| 476254 ||  || — || November 1, 2007 || Kitt Peak || Spacewatch || BRA || align=right | 1.6 km || 
|-id=255 bgcolor=#E9E9E9
| 476255 ||  || — || November 1, 2007 || Kitt Peak || Spacewatch || AGN || align=right | 1.1 km || 
|-id=256 bgcolor=#E9E9E9
| 476256 ||  || — || November 2, 2007 || Mount Lemmon || Mount Lemmon Survey || — || align=right | 1.8 km || 
|-id=257 bgcolor=#E9E9E9
| 476257 ||  || — || September 12, 2007 || Mount Lemmon || Mount Lemmon Survey || — || align=right | 1.9 km || 
|-id=258 bgcolor=#E9E9E9
| 476258 ||  || — || November 3, 2007 || Kitt Peak || Spacewatch || — || align=right | 1.8 km || 
|-id=259 bgcolor=#E9E9E9
| 476259 ||  || — || October 9, 2007 || Mount Lemmon || Mount Lemmon Survey || — || align=right | 1.5 km || 
|-id=260 bgcolor=#E9E9E9
| 476260 ||  || — || November 3, 2007 || Kitt Peak || Spacewatch || — || align=right | 2.0 km || 
|-id=261 bgcolor=#d6d6d6
| 476261 ||  || — || November 3, 2007 || Kitt Peak || Spacewatch || — || align=right | 2.2 km || 
|-id=262 bgcolor=#d6d6d6
| 476262 ||  || — || November 3, 2007 || Kitt Peak || Spacewatch || — || align=right | 2.1 km || 
|-id=263 bgcolor=#E9E9E9
| 476263 ||  || — || November 5, 2007 || Mount Lemmon || Mount Lemmon Survey || — || align=right | 1.5 km || 
|-id=264 bgcolor=#d6d6d6
| 476264 ||  || — || November 5, 2007 || Mount Lemmon || Mount Lemmon Survey || KOR || align=right | 1.2 km || 
|-id=265 bgcolor=#E9E9E9
| 476265 ||  || — || November 4, 2007 || Kitt Peak || Spacewatch || HOF || align=right | 2.7 km || 
|-id=266 bgcolor=#E9E9E9
| 476266 ||  || — || November 4, 2007 || Kitt Peak || Spacewatch || — || align=right | 1.9 km || 
|-id=267 bgcolor=#E9E9E9
| 476267 ||  || — || September 12, 2007 || Mount Lemmon || Mount Lemmon Survey || WIT || align=right data-sort-value="0.94" | 940 m || 
|-id=268 bgcolor=#E9E9E9
| 476268 ||  || — || November 5, 2007 || Kitt Peak || Spacewatch || — || align=right | 1.8 km || 
|-id=269 bgcolor=#E9E9E9
| 476269 ||  || — || October 20, 2007 || Mount Lemmon || Mount Lemmon Survey || — || align=right | 2.5 km || 
|-id=270 bgcolor=#E9E9E9
| 476270 ||  || — || November 5, 2007 || Kitt Peak || Spacewatch || AGN || align=right | 1.0 km || 
|-id=271 bgcolor=#d6d6d6
| 476271 ||  || — || November 5, 2007 || Kitt Peak || Spacewatch || KOR || align=right | 1.2 km || 
|-id=272 bgcolor=#d6d6d6
| 476272 ||  || — || November 5, 2007 || Kitt Peak || Spacewatch || — || align=right | 1.8 km || 
|-id=273 bgcolor=#d6d6d6
| 476273 ||  || — || November 7, 2007 || Mount Lemmon || Mount Lemmon Survey || KOR || align=right | 1.1 km || 
|-id=274 bgcolor=#d6d6d6
| 476274 ||  || — || November 7, 2007 || Mount Lemmon || Mount Lemmon Survey || — || align=right | 1.8 km || 
|-id=275 bgcolor=#E9E9E9
| 476275 ||  || — || November 8, 2007 || Catalina || CSS || — || align=right | 1.9 km || 
|-id=276 bgcolor=#E9E9E9
| 476276 ||  || — || November 7, 2007 || Mount Lemmon || Mount Lemmon Survey || — || align=right | 1.9 km || 
|-id=277 bgcolor=#d6d6d6
| 476277 ||  || — || November 9, 2007 || Mount Lemmon || Mount Lemmon Survey || KOR || align=right | 1.2 km || 
|-id=278 bgcolor=#E9E9E9
| 476278 ||  || — || October 20, 2007 || Mount Lemmon || Mount Lemmon Survey || AGN || align=right | 1.1 km || 
|-id=279 bgcolor=#d6d6d6
| 476279 ||  || — || November 5, 2007 || Kitt Peak || Spacewatch || KOR || align=right | 1.3 km || 
|-id=280 bgcolor=#E9E9E9
| 476280 ||  || — || November 9, 2007 || Kitt Peak || Spacewatch || GEF || align=right | 1.1 km || 
|-id=281 bgcolor=#E9E9E9
| 476281 ||  || — || October 13, 2007 || Kitt Peak || Spacewatch || — || align=right | 2.0 km || 
|-id=282 bgcolor=#E9E9E9
| 476282 ||  || — || October 18, 2007 || Kitt Peak || Spacewatch || — || align=right | 1.7 km || 
|-id=283 bgcolor=#d6d6d6
| 476283 ||  || — || November 3, 2007 || Kitt Peak || Spacewatch || KOR || align=right | 1.1 km || 
|-id=284 bgcolor=#E9E9E9
| 476284 ||  || — || November 3, 2007 || Kitt Peak || Spacewatch || — || align=right | 2.0 km || 
|-id=285 bgcolor=#E9E9E9
| 476285 ||  || — || October 16, 2007 || Mount Lemmon || Mount Lemmon Survey || — || align=right | 2.2 km || 
|-id=286 bgcolor=#E9E9E9
| 476286 ||  || — || November 5, 2007 || Kitt Peak || Spacewatch || — || align=right | 2.1 km || 
|-id=287 bgcolor=#E9E9E9
| 476287 ||  || — || November 5, 2007 || Catalina || CSS || DOR || align=right | 2.1 km || 
|-id=288 bgcolor=#E9E9E9
| 476288 ||  || — || November 15, 2007 || La Sagra || OAM Obs. || — || align=right | 2.0 km || 
|-id=289 bgcolor=#E9E9E9
| 476289 ||  || — || November 13, 2007 || Mount Lemmon || Mount Lemmon Survey || — || align=right | 1.8 km || 
|-id=290 bgcolor=#d6d6d6
| 476290 ||  || — || November 13, 2007 || Mount Lemmon || Mount Lemmon Survey || — || align=right | 2.3 km || 
|-id=291 bgcolor=#E9E9E9
| 476291 ||  || — || November 14, 2007 || Kitt Peak || Spacewatch || — || align=right | 2.1 km || 
|-id=292 bgcolor=#E9E9E9
| 476292 ||  || — || October 19, 2007 || Kitt Peak || Spacewatch || — || align=right | 1.9 km || 
|-id=293 bgcolor=#E9E9E9
| 476293 ||  || — || November 5, 2007 || Kitt Peak || Spacewatch || — || align=right | 2.2 km || 
|-id=294 bgcolor=#d6d6d6
| 476294 ||  || — || November 8, 2007 || Mount Lemmon || Mount Lemmon Survey || — || align=right | 2.3 km || 
|-id=295 bgcolor=#E9E9E9
| 476295 ||  || — || November 8, 2007 || Kitt Peak || Spacewatch || — || align=right | 2.1 km || 
|-id=296 bgcolor=#d6d6d6
| 476296 ||  || — || November 3, 2007 || Kitt Peak || Spacewatch || KOR || align=right | 1.3 km || 
|-id=297 bgcolor=#E9E9E9
| 476297 ||  || — || November 8, 2007 || Catalina || CSS || — || align=right | 3.8 km || 
|-id=298 bgcolor=#E9E9E9
| 476298 ||  || — || November 2, 2007 || Socorro || LINEAR || — || align=right | 2.0 km || 
|-id=299 bgcolor=#d6d6d6
| 476299 ||  || — || November 4, 2007 || Kitt Peak || Spacewatch || — || align=right | 2.2 km || 
|-id=300 bgcolor=#E9E9E9
| 476300 ||  || — || November 9, 2007 || Socorro || LINEAR || — || align=right | 2.0 km || 
|}

476301–476400 

|-bgcolor=#d6d6d6
| 476301 ||  || — || November 9, 2007 || Socorro || LINEAR || — || align=right | 2.6 km || 
|-id=302 bgcolor=#E9E9E9
| 476302 ||  || — || November 12, 2007 || Mount Lemmon || Mount Lemmon Survey || — || align=right | 2.5 km || 
|-id=303 bgcolor=#E9E9E9
| 476303 ||  || — || November 14, 2007 || Mount Lemmon || Mount Lemmon Survey || — || align=right | 2.0 km || 
|-id=304 bgcolor=#E9E9E9
| 476304 ||  || — || November 8, 2007 || Mount Lemmon || Mount Lemmon Survey || — || align=right | 2.3 km || 
|-id=305 bgcolor=#E9E9E9
| 476305 ||  || — || November 18, 2007 || Mount Lemmon || Mount Lemmon Survey || — || align=right | 2.9 km || 
|-id=306 bgcolor=#E9E9E9
| 476306 ||  || — || November 19, 2007 || Kitt Peak || Spacewatch || — || align=right | 3.4 km || 
|-id=307 bgcolor=#E9E9E9
| 476307 ||  || — || November 2, 2007 || Kitt Peak || Spacewatch || — || align=right | 2.0 km || 
|-id=308 bgcolor=#E9E9E9
| 476308 ||  || — || November 4, 2007 || Kitt Peak || Spacewatch || — || align=right | 2.2 km || 
|-id=309 bgcolor=#E9E9E9
| 476309 ||  || — || November 17, 2007 || Kitt Peak || Spacewatch || — || align=right | 2.5 km || 
|-id=310 bgcolor=#E9E9E9
| 476310 ||  || — || November 4, 2007 || Kitt Peak || Spacewatch || — || align=right | 2.1 km || 
|-id=311 bgcolor=#E9E9E9
| 476311 ||  || — || December 5, 2007 || Kitt Peak || Spacewatch || — || align=right | 2.5 km || 
|-id=312 bgcolor=#E9E9E9
| 476312 ||  || — || November 5, 2007 || Kitt Peak || Spacewatch || — || align=right | 2.2 km || 
|-id=313 bgcolor=#E9E9E9
| 476313 ||  || — || November 1, 2007 || Kitt Peak || Spacewatch || AGN || align=right | 1.2 km || 
|-id=314 bgcolor=#fefefe
| 476314 ||  || — || November 5, 2007 || Mount Lemmon || Mount Lemmon Survey || — || align=right data-sort-value="0.65" | 650 m || 
|-id=315 bgcolor=#E9E9E9
| 476315 ||  || — || November 3, 2007 || Kitt Peak || Spacewatch || — || align=right | 2.7 km || 
|-id=316 bgcolor=#d6d6d6
| 476316 ||  || — || December 5, 2007 || Kitt Peak || Spacewatch || — || align=right | 2.3 km || 
|-id=317 bgcolor=#d6d6d6
| 476317 ||  || — || December 15, 2007 || Kitt Peak || Spacewatch || — || align=right | 2.9 km || 
|-id=318 bgcolor=#fefefe
| 476318 ||  || — || December 15, 2007 || Kitt Peak || Spacewatch || — || align=right data-sort-value="0.59" | 590 m || 
|-id=319 bgcolor=#d6d6d6
| 476319 ||  || — || October 21, 2007 || Mount Lemmon || Mount Lemmon Survey || — || align=right | 2.7 km || 
|-id=320 bgcolor=#E9E9E9
| 476320 ||  || — || December 16, 2007 || La Sagra || OAM Obs. || — || align=right | 2.6 km || 
|-id=321 bgcolor=#E9E9E9
| 476321 ||  || — || December 17, 2007 || Piszkéstető || K. Sárneczky || GEF || align=right | 1.2 km || 
|-id=322 bgcolor=#E9E9E9
| 476322 ||  || — || October 14, 2007 || Mount Lemmon || Mount Lemmon Survey || AGN || align=right | 1.3 km || 
|-id=323 bgcolor=#E9E9E9
| 476323 ||  || — || December 16, 2007 || Kitt Peak || Spacewatch || — || align=right | 1.4 km || 
|-id=324 bgcolor=#d6d6d6
| 476324 ||  || — || December 16, 2007 || Mount Lemmon || Mount Lemmon Survey || EOS || align=right | 1.6 km || 
|-id=325 bgcolor=#d6d6d6
| 476325 ||  || — || December 18, 2007 || Mount Lemmon || Mount Lemmon Survey || — || align=right | 2.6 km || 
|-id=326 bgcolor=#E9E9E9
| 476326 ||  || — || December 19, 2007 || Kitt Peak || Spacewatch || — || align=right | 1.9 km || 
|-id=327 bgcolor=#d6d6d6
| 476327 ||  || — || December 30, 2007 || Kitt Peak || Spacewatch || EOS || align=right | 2.2 km || 
|-id=328 bgcolor=#fefefe
| 476328 ||  || — || December 31, 2007 || Kitt Peak || Spacewatch || — || align=right data-sort-value="0.83" | 830 m || 
|-id=329 bgcolor=#fefefe
| 476329 ||  || — || December 31, 2007 || Mount Lemmon || Mount Lemmon Survey || — || align=right data-sort-value="0.91" | 910 m || 
|-id=330 bgcolor=#d6d6d6
| 476330 ||  || — || December 30, 2007 || Kitt Peak || Spacewatch || — || align=right | 2.7 km || 
|-id=331 bgcolor=#d6d6d6
| 476331 ||  || — || January 10, 2008 || Mount Lemmon || Mount Lemmon Survey || — || align=right | 3.5 km || 
|-id=332 bgcolor=#d6d6d6
| 476332 ||  || — || November 7, 2007 || Mount Lemmon || Mount Lemmon Survey || — || align=right | 3.5 km || 
|-id=333 bgcolor=#d6d6d6
| 476333 ||  || — || December 31, 2007 || Catalina || CSS || — || align=right | 3.1 km || 
|-id=334 bgcolor=#fefefe
| 476334 ||  || — || January 10, 2008 || Kitt Peak || Spacewatch || — || align=right data-sort-value="0.54" | 540 m || 
|-id=335 bgcolor=#d6d6d6
| 476335 ||  || — || November 18, 2007 || Mount Lemmon || Mount Lemmon Survey || — || align=right | 3.2 km || 
|-id=336 bgcolor=#d6d6d6
| 476336 ||  || — || November 18, 2007 || Mount Lemmon || Mount Lemmon Survey || — || align=right | 2.8 km || 
|-id=337 bgcolor=#d6d6d6
| 476337 ||  || — || January 10, 2008 || Kitt Peak || Spacewatch || — || align=right | 3.3 km || 
|-id=338 bgcolor=#d6d6d6
| 476338 ||  || — || January 11, 2008 || Kitt Peak || Spacewatch || — || align=right | 2.6 km || 
|-id=339 bgcolor=#E9E9E9
| 476339 ||  || — || January 15, 2008 || Socorro || LINEAR || — || align=right | 2.3 km || 
|-id=340 bgcolor=#d6d6d6
| 476340 ||  || — || January 10, 2008 || Mount Lemmon || Mount Lemmon Survey || 615 || align=right | 1.3 km || 
|-id=341 bgcolor=#d6d6d6
| 476341 ||  || — || December 18, 2007 || Mount Lemmon || Mount Lemmon Survey || — || align=right | 3.0 km || 
|-id=342 bgcolor=#d6d6d6
| 476342 ||  || — || November 11, 2007 || Mount Lemmon || Mount Lemmon Survey || — || align=right | 2.7 km || 
|-id=343 bgcolor=#fefefe
| 476343 ||  || — || January 14, 2008 || Kitt Peak || Spacewatch || — || align=right data-sort-value="0.59" | 590 m || 
|-id=344 bgcolor=#d6d6d6
| 476344 ||  || — || January 14, 2008 || Kitt Peak || Spacewatch || — || align=right | 2.5 km || 
|-id=345 bgcolor=#d6d6d6
| 476345 ||  || — || December 4, 2007 || Mount Lemmon || Mount Lemmon Survey || — || align=right | 2.5 km || 
|-id=346 bgcolor=#E9E9E9
| 476346 ||  || — || December 14, 2007 || Mount Lemmon || Mount Lemmon Survey || — || align=right | 2.2 km || 
|-id=347 bgcolor=#d6d6d6
| 476347 ||  || — || January 10, 2008 || Mount Lemmon || Mount Lemmon Survey || — || align=right | 2.2 km || 
|-id=348 bgcolor=#d6d6d6
| 476348 ||  || — || January 6, 2008 || Mauna Kea || P. A. Wiegert || — || align=right | 1.8 km || 
|-id=349 bgcolor=#d6d6d6
| 476349 ||  || — || January 1, 2008 || Kitt Peak || Spacewatch || EOS || align=right | 1.4 km || 
|-id=350 bgcolor=#d6d6d6
| 476350 ||  || — || January 1, 2008 || Mount Lemmon || Mount Lemmon Survey || — || align=right | 2.2 km || 
|-id=351 bgcolor=#d6d6d6
| 476351 ||  || — || January 11, 2008 || Mount Lemmon || Mount Lemmon Survey || — || align=right | 2.5 km || 
|-id=352 bgcolor=#d6d6d6
| 476352 ||  || — || January 1, 2008 || Kitt Peak || Spacewatch || EOS || align=right | 2.0 km || 
|-id=353 bgcolor=#d6d6d6
| 476353 ||  || — || January 11, 2008 || Catalina || CSS || — || align=right | 3.1 km || 
|-id=354 bgcolor=#d6d6d6
| 476354 ||  || — || January 16, 2008 || Kitt Peak || Spacewatch || — || align=right | 2.4 km || 
|-id=355 bgcolor=#fefefe
| 476355 ||  || — || January 18, 2008 || Kitt Peak || Spacewatch || H || align=right data-sort-value="0.72" | 720 m || 
|-id=356 bgcolor=#d6d6d6
| 476356 ||  || — || November 11, 2007 || Mount Lemmon || Mount Lemmon Survey || KOR || align=right | 1.4 km || 
|-id=357 bgcolor=#d6d6d6
| 476357 ||  || — || January 31, 2008 || Mount Lemmon || Mount Lemmon Survey || — || align=right | 3.1 km || 
|-id=358 bgcolor=#d6d6d6
| 476358 ||  || — || January 30, 2008 || Kitt Peak || Spacewatch || EOS || align=right | 2.0 km || 
|-id=359 bgcolor=#d6d6d6
| 476359 ||  || — || December 20, 2007 || Mount Lemmon || Mount Lemmon Survey || EOS || align=right | 1.8 km || 
|-id=360 bgcolor=#d6d6d6
| 476360 ||  || — || January 30, 2008 || Catalina || CSS || — || align=right | 2.3 km || 
|-id=361 bgcolor=#d6d6d6
| 476361 ||  || — || January 30, 2008 || Mount Lemmon || Mount Lemmon Survey || — || align=right | 2.7 km || 
|-id=362 bgcolor=#fefefe
| 476362 ||  || — || January 30, 2008 || Mount Lemmon || Mount Lemmon Survey || — || align=right data-sort-value="0.73" | 730 m || 
|-id=363 bgcolor=#d6d6d6
| 476363 ||  || — || January 18, 2008 || Kitt Peak || Spacewatch || — || align=right | 1.9 km || 
|-id=364 bgcolor=#d6d6d6
| 476364 ||  || — || January 30, 2008 || Mount Lemmon || Mount Lemmon Survey || — || align=right | 2.8 km || 
|-id=365 bgcolor=#d6d6d6
| 476365 ||  || — || February 1, 2008 || Mount Lemmon || Mount Lemmon Survey || — || align=right | 4.0 km || 
|-id=366 bgcolor=#d6d6d6
| 476366 ||  || — || February 3, 2008 || Kitt Peak || Spacewatch || EOS || align=right | 2.1 km || 
|-id=367 bgcolor=#d6d6d6
| 476367 ||  || — || February 3, 2008 || Kitt Peak || Spacewatch || — || align=right | 4.0 km || 
|-id=368 bgcolor=#fefefe
| 476368 ||  || — || February 3, 2008 || Kitt Peak || Spacewatch || — || align=right data-sort-value="0.62" | 620 m || 
|-id=369 bgcolor=#d6d6d6
| 476369 ||  || — || January 10, 2008 || Mount Lemmon || Mount Lemmon Survey || — || align=right | 2.2 km || 
|-id=370 bgcolor=#fefefe
| 476370 ||  || — || January 10, 2008 || Mount Lemmon || Mount Lemmon Survey || — || align=right data-sort-value="0.58" | 580 m || 
|-id=371 bgcolor=#d6d6d6
| 476371 ||  || — || October 22, 2006 || Kitt Peak || Spacewatch || — || align=right | 2.0 km || 
|-id=372 bgcolor=#d6d6d6
| 476372 ||  || — || February 2, 2008 || Kitt Peak || Spacewatch || — || align=right | 2.8 km || 
|-id=373 bgcolor=#fefefe
| 476373 ||  || — || February 2, 2008 || Kitt Peak || Spacewatch || — || align=right data-sort-value="0.60" | 600 m || 
|-id=374 bgcolor=#d6d6d6
| 476374 ||  || — || February 2, 2008 || Kitt Peak || Spacewatch || — || align=right | 2.8 km || 
|-id=375 bgcolor=#d6d6d6
| 476375 ||  || — || February 2, 2008 || Kitt Peak || Spacewatch || — || align=right | 2.7 km || 
|-id=376 bgcolor=#fefefe
| 476376 ||  || — || February 2, 2008 || Kitt Peak || Spacewatch || — || align=right data-sort-value="0.66" | 660 m || 
|-id=377 bgcolor=#fefefe
| 476377 ||  || — || February 2, 2008 || Kitt Peak || Spacewatch || — || align=right data-sort-value="0.69" | 690 m || 
|-id=378 bgcolor=#d6d6d6
| 476378 ||  || — || February 2, 2008 || Kitt Peak || Spacewatch || — || align=right | 2.8 km || 
|-id=379 bgcolor=#d6d6d6
| 476379 ||  || — || February 3, 2008 || Kitt Peak || Spacewatch || — || align=right | 2.6 km || 
|-id=380 bgcolor=#d6d6d6
| 476380 ||  || — || February 3, 2008 || Kitt Peak || Spacewatch || EOS || align=right | 1.6 km || 
|-id=381 bgcolor=#d6d6d6
| 476381 ||  || — || January 1, 2008 || Mount Lemmon || Mount Lemmon Survey || — || align=right | 2.9 km || 
|-id=382 bgcolor=#d6d6d6
| 476382 ||  || — || January 14, 2008 || Kitt Peak || Spacewatch || — || align=right | 3.1 km || 
|-id=383 bgcolor=#d6d6d6
| 476383 ||  || — || January 11, 2008 || Kitt Peak || Spacewatch || — || align=right | 3.1 km || 
|-id=384 bgcolor=#d6d6d6
| 476384 ||  || — || January 20, 2008 || Kitt Peak || Spacewatch || TEL || align=right | 1.3 km || 
|-id=385 bgcolor=#d6d6d6
| 476385 ||  || — || December 5, 2007 || Mount Lemmon || Mount Lemmon Survey || — || align=right | 3.6 km || 
|-id=386 bgcolor=#d6d6d6
| 476386 ||  || — || February 6, 2008 || Catalina || CSS || — || align=right | 3.5 km || 
|-id=387 bgcolor=#d6d6d6
| 476387 ||  || — || February 8, 2008 || Kitt Peak || Spacewatch || — || align=right | 2.4 km || 
|-id=388 bgcolor=#d6d6d6
| 476388 ||  || — || February 9, 2008 || Catalina || CSS || — || align=right | 2.7 km || 
|-id=389 bgcolor=#d6d6d6
| 476389 ||  || — || January 31, 2008 || Mount Lemmon || Mount Lemmon Survey || — || align=right | 2.8 km || 
|-id=390 bgcolor=#d6d6d6
| 476390 ||  || — || January 12, 2008 || Kitt Peak || Spacewatch || EOS || align=right | 1.9 km || 
|-id=391 bgcolor=#fefefe
| 476391 ||  || — || January 10, 2008 || Kitt Peak || Spacewatch || — || align=right data-sort-value="0.53" | 530 m || 
|-id=392 bgcolor=#fefefe
| 476392 ||  || — || February 9, 2008 || Kitt Peak || Spacewatch || — || align=right data-sort-value="0.74" | 740 m || 
|-id=393 bgcolor=#d6d6d6
| 476393 ||  || — || February 2, 2008 || Kitt Peak || Spacewatch || VER || align=right | 2.6 km || 
|-id=394 bgcolor=#d6d6d6
| 476394 ||  || — || January 12, 2008 || Mount Lemmon || Mount Lemmon Survey || — || align=right | 2.1 km || 
|-id=395 bgcolor=#d6d6d6
| 476395 ||  || — || February 12, 2008 || Mount Lemmon || Mount Lemmon Survey || — || align=right | 2.9 km || 
|-id=396 bgcolor=#fefefe
| 476396 ||  || — || February 11, 2008 || Mount Lemmon || Mount Lemmon Survey || — || align=right data-sort-value="0.89" | 890 m || 
|-id=397 bgcolor=#fefefe
| 476397 ||  || — || February 2, 2008 || Kitt Peak || Spacewatch || — || align=right data-sort-value="0.69" | 690 m || 
|-id=398 bgcolor=#d6d6d6
| 476398 ||  || — || February 2, 2008 || Kitt Peak || Spacewatch || EOS || align=right | 1.8 km || 
|-id=399 bgcolor=#d6d6d6
| 476399 ||  || — || February 7, 2008 || Mount Lemmon || Mount Lemmon Survey || — || align=right | 2.5 km || 
|-id=400 bgcolor=#d6d6d6
| 476400 ||  || — || February 9, 2008 || Catalina || CSS || — || align=right | 3.1 km || 
|}

476401–476500 

|-bgcolor=#d6d6d6
| 476401 ||  || — || February 10, 2008 || Mount Lemmon || Mount Lemmon Survey || — || align=right | 2.9 km || 
|-id=402 bgcolor=#fefefe
| 476402 ||  || — || February 11, 2008 || Mount Lemmon || Mount Lemmon Survey || — || align=right data-sort-value="0.65" | 650 m || 
|-id=403 bgcolor=#d6d6d6
| 476403 ||  || — || February 12, 2008 || Kitt Peak || Spacewatch || — || align=right | 3.4 km || 
|-id=404 bgcolor=#d6d6d6
| 476404 ||  || — || February 13, 2008 || Kitt Peak || Spacewatch || — || align=right | 2.0 km || 
|-id=405 bgcolor=#d6d6d6
| 476405 ||  || — || February 13, 2008 || Kitt Peak || Spacewatch || — || align=right | 2.2 km || 
|-id=406 bgcolor=#d6d6d6
| 476406 ||  || — || February 13, 2008 || Kitt Peak || Spacewatch || — || align=right | 2.3 km || 
|-id=407 bgcolor=#d6d6d6
| 476407 ||  || — || February 10, 2008 || Kitt Peak || Spacewatch || — || align=right | 2.2 km || 
|-id=408 bgcolor=#d6d6d6
| 476408 ||  || — || February 2, 2008 || Kitt Peak || Spacewatch || — || align=right | 2.7 km || 
|-id=409 bgcolor=#fefefe
| 476409 ||  || — || February 8, 2008 || Mount Lemmon || Mount Lemmon Survey || — || align=right data-sort-value="0.79" | 790 m || 
|-id=410 bgcolor=#d6d6d6
| 476410 ||  || — || February 24, 2008 || Kitt Peak || Spacewatch || — || align=right | 3.4 km || 
|-id=411 bgcolor=#d6d6d6
| 476411 ||  || — || February 8, 2008 || Kitt Peak || Spacewatch || — || align=right | 2.2 km || 
|-id=412 bgcolor=#d6d6d6
| 476412 ||  || — || January 30, 2008 || Mount Lemmon || Mount Lemmon Survey || — || align=right | 2.0 km || 
|-id=413 bgcolor=#d6d6d6
| 476413 ||  || — || February 7, 2008 || Kitt Peak || Spacewatch || — || align=right | 2.9 km || 
|-id=414 bgcolor=#d6d6d6
| 476414 ||  || — || February 26, 2008 || Mount Lemmon || Mount Lemmon Survey || — || align=right | 2.5 km || 
|-id=415 bgcolor=#fefefe
| 476415 ||  || — || February 28, 2008 || Kitt Peak || Spacewatch || — || align=right data-sort-value="0.70" | 700 m || 
|-id=416 bgcolor=#fefefe
| 476416 ||  || — || February 29, 2008 || Purple Mountain || PMO NEO || — || align=right data-sort-value="0.75" | 750 m || 
|-id=417 bgcolor=#d6d6d6
| 476417 ||  || — || January 10, 2008 || Mount Lemmon || Mount Lemmon Survey || — || align=right | 2.8 km || 
|-id=418 bgcolor=#d6d6d6
| 476418 ||  || — || January 19, 2008 || Kitt Peak || Spacewatch || — || align=right | 2.5 km || 
|-id=419 bgcolor=#d6d6d6
| 476419 ||  || — || February 2, 2008 || Kitt Peak || Spacewatch || EOS || align=right | 1.7 km || 
|-id=420 bgcolor=#d6d6d6
| 476420 ||  || — || February 27, 2008 || Kitt Peak || Spacewatch || — || align=right | 4.4 km || 
|-id=421 bgcolor=#d6d6d6
| 476421 ||  || — || January 11, 2008 || Kitt Peak || Spacewatch || — || align=right | 2.7 km || 
|-id=422 bgcolor=#d6d6d6
| 476422 ||  || — || February 10, 2008 || Kitt Peak || Spacewatch || — || align=right | 3.1 km || 
|-id=423 bgcolor=#FA8072
| 476423 ||  || — || February 26, 2008 || Kitt Peak || Spacewatch || H || align=right data-sort-value="0.58" | 580 m || 
|-id=424 bgcolor=#d6d6d6
| 476424 ||  || — || January 31, 2008 || Kitt Peak || Spacewatch || — || align=right | 2.6 km || 
|-id=425 bgcolor=#d6d6d6
| 476425 ||  || — || February 28, 2008 || Mount Lemmon || Mount Lemmon Survey || — || align=right | 3.1 km || 
|-id=426 bgcolor=#d6d6d6
| 476426 ||  || — || February 9, 2008 || Mount Lemmon || Mount Lemmon Survey || — || align=right | 2.9 km || 
|-id=427 bgcolor=#fefefe
| 476427 ||  || — || February 29, 2008 || Kitt Peak || Spacewatch || — || align=right data-sort-value="0.74" | 740 m || 
|-id=428 bgcolor=#d6d6d6
| 476428 ||  || — || February 2, 2008 || Kitt Peak || Spacewatch || HYG || align=right | 2.5 km || 
|-id=429 bgcolor=#fefefe
| 476429 ||  || — || January 30, 2008 || Kitt Peak || Spacewatch || — || align=right data-sort-value="0.78" | 780 m || 
|-id=430 bgcolor=#fefefe
| 476430 ||  || — || February 7, 2008 || Socorro || LINEAR || — || align=right | 1.0 km || 
|-id=431 bgcolor=#d6d6d6
| 476431 ||  || — || February 28, 2008 || Kitt Peak || Spacewatch || — || align=right | 2.8 km || 
|-id=432 bgcolor=#d6d6d6
| 476432 ||  || — || February 28, 2008 || Mount Lemmon || Mount Lemmon Survey || EOS || align=right | 1.5 km || 
|-id=433 bgcolor=#fefefe
| 476433 ||  || — || February 28, 2008 || Kitt Peak || Spacewatch || — || align=right data-sort-value="0.62" | 620 m || 
|-id=434 bgcolor=#d6d6d6
| 476434 ||  || — || February 29, 2008 || Mount Lemmon || Mount Lemmon Survey || — || align=right | 2.7 km || 
|-id=435 bgcolor=#fefefe
| 476435 ||  || — || February 28, 2008 || Kitt Peak || Spacewatch || — || align=right data-sort-value="0.70" | 700 m || 
|-id=436 bgcolor=#d6d6d6
| 476436 ||  || — || February 28, 2008 || Mount Lemmon || Mount Lemmon Survey || — || align=right | 3.7 km || 
|-id=437 bgcolor=#fefefe
| 476437 ||  || — || February 14, 2008 || Mount Lemmon || Mount Lemmon Survey || — || align=right data-sort-value="0.52" | 520 m || 
|-id=438 bgcolor=#FFC2E0
| 476438 ||  || — || March 8, 2008 || Kitt Peak || Spacewatch || AMO || align=right data-sort-value="0.43" | 430 m || 
|-id=439 bgcolor=#d6d6d6
| 476439 ||  || — || January 30, 2008 || Mount Lemmon || Mount Lemmon Survey || — || align=right | 2.7 km || 
|-id=440 bgcolor=#fefefe
| 476440 ||  || — || October 19, 2006 || Mount Lemmon || Mount Lemmon Survey || — || align=right data-sort-value="0.94" | 940 m || 
|-id=441 bgcolor=#d6d6d6
| 476441 ||  || — || February 12, 2008 || Mount Lemmon || Mount Lemmon Survey || — || align=right | 2.7 km || 
|-id=442 bgcolor=#d6d6d6
| 476442 ||  || — || March 4, 2008 || Mount Lemmon || Mount Lemmon Survey || — || align=right | 2.2 km || 
|-id=443 bgcolor=#fefefe
| 476443 ||  || — || March 2, 2008 || Mount Lemmon || Mount Lemmon Survey || — || align=right data-sort-value="0.69" | 690 m || 
|-id=444 bgcolor=#d6d6d6
| 476444 ||  || — || January 13, 2002 || Socorro || LINEAR || — || align=right | 2.8 km || 
|-id=445 bgcolor=#fefefe
| 476445 ||  || — || February 29, 2008 || Kitt Peak || Spacewatch || — || align=right data-sort-value="0.84" | 840 m || 
|-id=446 bgcolor=#d6d6d6
| 476446 ||  || — || March 4, 2008 || Kitt Peak || Spacewatch || — || align=right | 2.6 km || 
|-id=447 bgcolor=#fefefe
| 476447 ||  || — || March 4, 2008 || Kitt Peak || Spacewatch || — || align=right data-sort-value="0.71" | 710 m || 
|-id=448 bgcolor=#fefefe
| 476448 ||  || — || February 12, 2008 || Mount Lemmon || Mount Lemmon Survey || — || align=right data-sort-value="0.65" | 650 m || 
|-id=449 bgcolor=#fefefe
| 476449 ||  || — || March 5, 2008 || Kitt Peak || Spacewatch || — || align=right data-sort-value="0.80" | 800 m || 
|-id=450 bgcolor=#d6d6d6
| 476450 ||  || — || March 6, 2008 || Mount Lemmon || Mount Lemmon Survey || — || align=right | 1.8 km || 
|-id=451 bgcolor=#d6d6d6
| 476451 ||  || — || March 6, 2008 || Mount Lemmon || Mount Lemmon Survey || — || align=right | 3.5 km || 
|-id=452 bgcolor=#fefefe
| 476452 ||  || — || March 6, 2008 || Kitt Peak || Spacewatch || ERI || align=right | 1.2 km || 
|-id=453 bgcolor=#d6d6d6
| 476453 ||  || — || February 8, 2008 || Kitt Peak || Spacewatch || — || align=right | 2.7 km || 
|-id=454 bgcolor=#d6d6d6
| 476454 ||  || — || March 9, 2008 || Mount Lemmon || Mount Lemmon Survey || — || align=right | 2.6 km || 
|-id=455 bgcolor=#fefefe
| 476455 ||  || — || January 15, 2008 || Mount Lemmon || Mount Lemmon Survey || — || align=right data-sort-value="0.77" | 770 m || 
|-id=456 bgcolor=#fefefe
| 476456 ||  || — || February 28, 2008 || Kitt Peak || Spacewatch || — || align=right data-sort-value="0.82" | 820 m || 
|-id=457 bgcolor=#d6d6d6
| 476457 ||  || — || January 20, 2008 || Mount Lemmon || Mount Lemmon Survey || — || align=right | 3.5 km || 
|-id=458 bgcolor=#d6d6d6
| 476458 ||  || — || February 13, 2008 || Kitt Peak || Spacewatch || — || align=right | 2.5 km || 
|-id=459 bgcolor=#d6d6d6
| 476459 ||  || — || March 8, 2008 || Kitt Peak || Spacewatch || Tj (2.99) || align=right | 4.1 km || 
|-id=460 bgcolor=#fefefe
| 476460 ||  || — || March 10, 2008 || Kitt Peak || Spacewatch || — || align=right data-sort-value="0.60" | 600 m || 
|-id=461 bgcolor=#fefefe
| 476461 ||  || — || March 10, 2008 || Kitt Peak || Spacewatch || — || align=right data-sort-value="0.65" | 650 m || 
|-id=462 bgcolor=#d6d6d6
| 476462 ||  || — || March 11, 2008 || Kitt Peak || Spacewatch || — || align=right | 3.2 km || 
|-id=463 bgcolor=#d6d6d6
| 476463 ||  || — || February 7, 2002 || Kitt Peak || Spacewatch || — || align=right | 3.5 km || 
|-id=464 bgcolor=#d6d6d6
| 476464 ||  || — || March 5, 2008 || Kitt Peak || Spacewatch || — || align=right | 2.8 km || 
|-id=465 bgcolor=#d6d6d6
| 476465 ||  || — || March 11, 2008 || Mount Lemmon || Mount Lemmon Survey || EOS || align=right | 1.5 km || 
|-id=466 bgcolor=#d6d6d6
| 476466 ||  || — || March 5, 2008 || Kitt Peak || Spacewatch || 7:4 || align=right | 3.0 km || 
|-id=467 bgcolor=#d6d6d6
| 476467 ||  || — || March 5, 2008 || Socorro || LINEAR || — || align=right | 3.4 km || 
|-id=468 bgcolor=#fefefe
| 476468 ||  || — || March 10, 2008 || Kitt Peak || Spacewatch || — || align=right data-sort-value="0.59" | 590 m || 
|-id=469 bgcolor=#d6d6d6
| 476469 ||  || — || March 1, 2008 || Kitt Peak || Spacewatch || — || align=right | 3.6 km || 
|-id=470 bgcolor=#d6d6d6
| 476470 ||  || — || March 1, 2008 || Kitt Peak || Spacewatch || — || align=right | 2.5 km || 
|-id=471 bgcolor=#fefefe
| 476471 ||  || — || March 25, 2008 || Kitt Peak || Spacewatch || — || align=right data-sort-value="0.71" | 710 m || 
|-id=472 bgcolor=#d6d6d6
| 476472 ||  || — || January 11, 2008 || Mount Lemmon || Mount Lemmon Survey || — || align=right | 2.9 km || 
|-id=473 bgcolor=#d6d6d6
| 476473 ||  || — || August 29, 2005 || Kitt Peak || Spacewatch || EOS || align=right | 2.0 km || 
|-id=474 bgcolor=#d6d6d6
| 476474 ||  || — || March 27, 2008 || Mount Lemmon || Mount Lemmon Survey || EOS || align=right | 1.7 km || 
|-id=475 bgcolor=#d6d6d6
| 476475 ||  || — || March 10, 2008 || Mount Lemmon || Mount Lemmon Survey || — || align=right | 2.6 km || 
|-id=476 bgcolor=#fefefe
| 476476 ||  || — || March 27, 2008 || Kitt Peak || Spacewatch || V || align=right data-sort-value="0.74" | 740 m || 
|-id=477 bgcolor=#d6d6d6
| 476477 ||  || — || February 3, 2008 || Kitt Peak || Spacewatch || — || align=right | 3.7 km || 
|-id=478 bgcolor=#d6d6d6
| 476478 ||  || — || February 7, 2008 || Mount Lemmon || Mount Lemmon Survey || — || align=right | 2.6 km || 
|-id=479 bgcolor=#d6d6d6
| 476479 ||  || — || February 7, 2008 || Mount Lemmon || Mount Lemmon Survey || — || align=right | 3.2 km || 
|-id=480 bgcolor=#d6d6d6
| 476480 ||  || — || March 2, 2008 || Kitt Peak || Spacewatch || — || align=right | 3.0 km || 
|-id=481 bgcolor=#fefefe
| 476481 ||  || — || March 28, 2008 || Mount Lemmon || Mount Lemmon Survey || — || align=right data-sort-value="0.68" | 680 m || 
|-id=482 bgcolor=#d6d6d6
| 476482 ||  || — || March 2, 2008 || Kitt Peak || Spacewatch || — || align=right | 2.1 km || 
|-id=483 bgcolor=#fefefe
| 476483 ||  || — || March 28, 2008 || Mount Lemmon || Mount Lemmon Survey || — || align=right data-sort-value="0.91" | 910 m || 
|-id=484 bgcolor=#fefefe
| 476484 ||  || — || March 12, 2008 || Mount Lemmon || Mount Lemmon Survey || — || align=right data-sort-value="0.66" | 660 m || 
|-id=485 bgcolor=#d6d6d6
| 476485 ||  || — || December 16, 2007 || Kitt Peak || Spacewatch || — || align=right | 3.7 km || 
|-id=486 bgcolor=#fefefe
| 476486 ||  || — || March 27, 2008 || Kitt Peak || Spacewatch || — || align=right data-sort-value="0.77" | 770 m || 
|-id=487 bgcolor=#fefefe
| 476487 ||  || — || March 5, 2008 || Mount Lemmon || Mount Lemmon Survey || MAS || align=right data-sort-value="0.71" | 710 m || 
|-id=488 bgcolor=#d6d6d6
| 476488 ||  || — || February 12, 2008 || Kitt Peak || Spacewatch || LIX || align=right | 3.7 km || 
|-id=489 bgcolor=#fefefe
| 476489 ||  || — || March 30, 2008 || Kitt Peak || Spacewatch || — || align=right data-sort-value="0.63" | 630 m || 
|-id=490 bgcolor=#fefefe
| 476490 ||  || — || March 30, 2008 || Kitt Peak || Spacewatch || — || align=right data-sort-value="0.82" | 820 m || 
|-id=491 bgcolor=#fefefe
| 476491 ||  || — || March 31, 2008 || Kitt Peak || Spacewatch || NYS || align=right data-sort-value="0.50" | 500 m || 
|-id=492 bgcolor=#d6d6d6
| 476492 ||  || — || March 11, 2008 || Kitt Peak || Spacewatch || — || align=right | 2.4 km || 
|-id=493 bgcolor=#fefefe
| 476493 ||  || — || March 31, 2008 || Kitt Peak || Spacewatch || — || align=right data-sort-value="0.78" | 780 m || 
|-id=494 bgcolor=#fefefe
| 476494 ||  || — || March 31, 2008 || Kitt Peak || Spacewatch || — || align=right data-sort-value="0.53" | 530 m || 
|-id=495 bgcolor=#d6d6d6
| 476495 ||  || — || March 31, 2008 || Mount Lemmon || Mount Lemmon Survey || EMA || align=right | 3.2 km || 
|-id=496 bgcolor=#d6d6d6
| 476496 ||  || — || March 28, 2008 || Kitt Peak || Spacewatch || — || align=right | 3.3 km || 
|-id=497 bgcolor=#fefefe
| 476497 ||  || — || March 27, 2008 || Kitt Peak || Spacewatch || — || align=right data-sort-value="0.72" | 720 m || 
|-id=498 bgcolor=#d6d6d6
| 476498 ||  || — || March 30, 2008 || Kitt Peak || Spacewatch || — || align=right | 2.4 km || 
|-id=499 bgcolor=#fefefe
| 476499 ||  || — || March 26, 2008 || Kitt Peak || Spacewatch || — || align=right data-sort-value="0.75" | 750 m || 
|-id=500 bgcolor=#d6d6d6
| 476500 ||  || — || April 1, 2008 || Kitt Peak || Spacewatch || — || align=right | 3.9 km || 
|}

476501–476600 

|-bgcolor=#d6d6d6
| 476501 ||  || — || April 1, 2008 || Kitt Peak || Spacewatch || — || align=right | 3.4 km || 
|-id=502 bgcolor=#d6d6d6
| 476502 ||  || — || April 1, 2008 || Kitt Peak || Spacewatch || VER || align=right | 2.4 km || 
|-id=503 bgcolor=#fefefe
| 476503 ||  || — || April 3, 2008 || Kitt Peak || Spacewatch || — || align=right data-sort-value="0.63" | 630 m || 
|-id=504 bgcolor=#FA8072
| 476504 ||  || — || March 31, 2008 || Mount Lemmon || Mount Lemmon Survey || H || align=right data-sort-value="0.50" | 500 m || 
|-id=505 bgcolor=#d6d6d6
| 476505 ||  || — || April 13, 2008 || Sierra Nevada || Sierra Nevada Obs. || — || align=right | 4.7 km || 
|-id=506 bgcolor=#fefefe
| 476506 ||  || — || April 3, 2008 || Kitt Peak || Spacewatch || — || align=right data-sort-value="0.66" | 660 m || 
|-id=507 bgcolor=#d6d6d6
| 476507 ||  || — || April 3, 2008 || Mount Lemmon || Mount Lemmon Survey || — || align=right | 3.3 km || 
|-id=508 bgcolor=#fefefe
| 476508 ||  || — || April 4, 2008 || Mount Lemmon || Mount Lemmon Survey || — || align=right data-sort-value="0.48" | 480 m || 
|-id=509 bgcolor=#fefefe
| 476509 ||  || — || February 26, 2008 || Mount Lemmon || Mount Lemmon Survey || — || align=right data-sort-value="0.67" | 670 m || 
|-id=510 bgcolor=#d6d6d6
| 476510 ||  || — || October 1, 2005 || Kitt Peak || Spacewatch || EOS || align=right | 1.8 km || 
|-id=511 bgcolor=#fefefe
| 476511 ||  || — || April 5, 2008 || Mount Lemmon || Mount Lemmon Survey || critical || align=right data-sort-value="0.59" | 590 m || 
|-id=512 bgcolor=#d6d6d6
| 476512 ||  || — || March 28, 2008 || Mount Lemmon || Mount Lemmon Survey || — || align=right | 2.6 km || 
|-id=513 bgcolor=#d6d6d6
| 476513 ||  || — || April 5, 2008 || Mount Lemmon || Mount Lemmon Survey || — || align=right | 3.0 km || 
|-id=514 bgcolor=#fefefe
| 476514 ||  || — || April 6, 2008 || Kitt Peak || Spacewatch || NYS || align=right data-sort-value="0.56" | 560 m || 
|-id=515 bgcolor=#fefefe
| 476515 ||  || — || April 6, 2008 || Mount Lemmon || Mount Lemmon Survey || — || align=right | 1.2 km || 
|-id=516 bgcolor=#d6d6d6
| 476516 ||  || — || March 2, 2008 || Kitt Peak || Spacewatch || — || align=right | 2.8 km || 
|-id=517 bgcolor=#d6d6d6
| 476517 ||  || — || March 31, 2008 || Mount Lemmon || Mount Lemmon Survey || — || align=right | 2.9 km || 
|-id=518 bgcolor=#d6d6d6
| 476518 ||  || — || April 3, 2008 || Kitt Peak || Spacewatch || VER || align=right | 3.0 km || 
|-id=519 bgcolor=#fefefe
| 476519 ||  || — || April 7, 2008 || Kitt Peak || Spacewatch || — || align=right data-sort-value="0.58" | 580 m || 
|-id=520 bgcolor=#d6d6d6
| 476520 ||  || — || March 5, 2008 || Kitt Peak || Spacewatch || — || align=right | 2.7 km || 
|-id=521 bgcolor=#fefefe
| 476521 ||  || — || April 8, 2008 || Mount Lemmon || Mount Lemmon Survey || — || align=right data-sort-value="0.66" | 660 m || 
|-id=522 bgcolor=#fefefe
| 476522 ||  || — || March 29, 2008 || Mount Lemmon || Mount Lemmon Survey || MAS || align=right data-sort-value="0.54" | 540 m || 
|-id=523 bgcolor=#fefefe
| 476523 ||  || — || April 6, 2008 || Kitt Peak || Spacewatch || — || align=right data-sort-value="0.75" | 750 m || 
|-id=524 bgcolor=#fefefe
| 476524 ||  || — || April 7, 2008 || Kitt Peak || Spacewatch || — || align=right data-sort-value="0.68" | 680 m || 
|-id=525 bgcolor=#d6d6d6
| 476525 ||  || — || March 7, 2008 || Mount Lemmon || Mount Lemmon Survey || — || align=right | 3.4 km || 
|-id=526 bgcolor=#fefefe
| 476526 ||  || — || April 9, 2008 || Kitt Peak || Spacewatch || — || align=right data-sort-value="0.68" | 680 m || 
|-id=527 bgcolor=#d6d6d6
| 476527 ||  || — || April 11, 2008 || Kitt Peak || Spacewatch || 7:4 || align=right | 4.3 km || 
|-id=528 bgcolor=#fefefe
| 476528 ||  || — || March 8, 2008 || Socorro || LINEAR || — || align=right | 1.3 km || 
|-id=529 bgcolor=#d6d6d6
| 476529 ||  || — || April 11, 2008 || Kitt Peak || Spacewatch || — || align=right | 4.0 km || 
|-id=530 bgcolor=#fefefe
| 476530 ||  || — || April 4, 2008 || Catalina || CSS || — || align=right data-sort-value="0.78" | 780 m || 
|-id=531 bgcolor=#d6d6d6
| 476531 ||  || — || April 4, 2008 || Mount Lemmon || Mount Lemmon Survey || — || align=right | 3.6 km || 
|-id=532 bgcolor=#fefefe
| 476532 ||  || — || April 6, 2008 || Kitt Peak || Spacewatch || — || align=right data-sort-value="0.56" | 560 m || 
|-id=533 bgcolor=#fefefe
| 476533 ||  || — || April 1, 2008 || Kitt Peak || Spacewatch || — || align=right data-sort-value="0.87" | 870 m || 
|-id=534 bgcolor=#C2FFFF
| 476534 ||  || — || April 1, 2008 || Kitt Peak || Spacewatch || L5 || align=right | 7.3 km || 
|-id=535 bgcolor=#fefefe
| 476535 ||  || — || April 14, 2008 || Catalina || CSS || — || align=right data-sort-value="0.82" | 820 m || 
|-id=536 bgcolor=#d6d6d6
| 476536 ||  || — || March 13, 2008 || Kitt Peak || Spacewatch || — || align=right | 3.3 km || 
|-id=537 bgcolor=#fefefe
| 476537 ||  || — || March 10, 2008 || Kitt Peak || Spacewatch || — || align=right data-sort-value="0.59" | 590 m || 
|-id=538 bgcolor=#d6d6d6
| 476538 ||  || — || April 24, 2008 || Mount Lemmon || Mount Lemmon Survey || — || align=right | 3.3 km || 
|-id=539 bgcolor=#d6d6d6
| 476539 ||  || — || April 25, 2008 || Kitt Peak || Spacewatch || Tj (2.96) || align=right | 3.1 km || 
|-id=540 bgcolor=#d6d6d6
| 476540 ||  || — || April 3, 2008 || Mount Lemmon || Mount Lemmon Survey || — || align=right | 2.7 km || 
|-id=541 bgcolor=#fefefe
| 476541 ||  || — || April 4, 2008 || Kitt Peak || Spacewatch || — || align=right data-sort-value="0.79" | 790 m || 
|-id=542 bgcolor=#d6d6d6
| 476542 ||  || — || April 4, 2008 || Kitt Peak || Spacewatch || — || align=right | 3.3 km || 
|-id=543 bgcolor=#d6d6d6
| 476543 ||  || — || April 27, 2008 || Mount Lemmon || Mount Lemmon Survey || EOS || align=right | 1.7 km || 
|-id=544 bgcolor=#d6d6d6
| 476544 ||  || — || April 27, 2008 || Mount Lemmon || Mount Lemmon Survey || — || align=right | 4.0 km || 
|-id=545 bgcolor=#fefefe
| 476545 ||  || — || April 28, 2008 || Kitt Peak || Spacewatch || NYS || align=right data-sort-value="0.58" | 580 m || 
|-id=546 bgcolor=#fefefe
| 476546 ||  || — || April 29, 2008 || Kitt Peak || Spacewatch || — || align=right data-sort-value="0.65" | 650 m || 
|-id=547 bgcolor=#fefefe
| 476547 ||  || — || April 14, 2008 || Kitt Peak || Spacewatch || — || align=right data-sort-value="0.74" | 740 m || 
|-id=548 bgcolor=#fefefe
| 476548 ||  || — || April 30, 2008 || Kitt Peak || Spacewatch || — || align=right data-sort-value="0.71" | 710 m || 
|-id=549 bgcolor=#fefefe
| 476549 ||  || — || April 29, 2008 || Kitt Peak || Spacewatch || — || align=right data-sort-value="0.66" | 660 m || 
|-id=550 bgcolor=#d6d6d6
| 476550 ||  || — || March 30, 2008 || Kitt Peak || Spacewatch || — || align=right | 2.6 km || 
|-id=551 bgcolor=#fefefe
| 476551 ||  || — || May 5, 2008 || Mount Lemmon || Mount Lemmon Survey || — || align=right data-sort-value="0.94" | 940 m || 
|-id=552 bgcolor=#fefefe
| 476552 ||  || — || April 3, 2008 || Mount Lemmon || Mount Lemmon Survey || — || align=right data-sort-value="0.61" | 610 m || 
|-id=553 bgcolor=#d6d6d6
| 476553 ||  || — || May 3, 2008 || Mount Lemmon || Mount Lemmon Survey || — || align=right | 3.1 km || 
|-id=554 bgcolor=#fefefe
| 476554 ||  || — || March 31, 2008 || Kitt Peak || Spacewatch || — || align=right data-sort-value="0.78" | 780 m || 
|-id=555 bgcolor=#d6d6d6
| 476555 ||  || — || May 8, 2008 || Kitt Peak || Spacewatch || — || align=right | 3.9 km || 
|-id=556 bgcolor=#d6d6d6
| 476556 ||  || — || May 11, 2008 || Kitt Peak || Spacewatch || — || align=right | 3.3 km || 
|-id=557 bgcolor=#fefefe
| 476557 ||  || — || May 26, 2008 || Kitt Peak || Spacewatch || — || align=right data-sort-value="0.78" | 780 m || 
|-id=558 bgcolor=#fefefe
| 476558 ||  || — || May 28, 2008 || Mount Lemmon || Mount Lemmon Survey || — || align=right data-sort-value="0.71" | 710 m || 
|-id=559 bgcolor=#FA8072
| 476559 ||  || — || July 28, 2008 || Dauban || F. Kugel || — || align=right data-sort-value="0.99" | 990 m || 
|-id=560 bgcolor=#d6d6d6
| 476560 ||  || — || July 28, 2008 || La Sagra || OAM Obs. || SHU3:2 || align=right | 6.1 km || 
|-id=561 bgcolor=#fefefe
| 476561 ||  || — || July 29, 2008 || Kitt Peak || Spacewatch || — || align=right data-sort-value="0.72" | 720 m || 
|-id=562 bgcolor=#fefefe
| 476562 ||  || — || July 29, 2008 || Kitt Peak || Spacewatch || — || align=right data-sort-value="0.79" | 790 m || 
|-id=563 bgcolor=#E9E9E9
| 476563 ||  || — || August 7, 2008 || Kitt Peak || Spacewatch || — || align=right data-sort-value="0.55" | 550 m || 
|-id=564 bgcolor=#fefefe
| 476564 ||  || — || August 26, 2008 || Socorro || LINEAR || — || align=right | 1.0 km || 
|-id=565 bgcolor=#E9E9E9
| 476565 ||  || — || August 21, 2008 || Kitt Peak || Spacewatch || — || align=right data-sort-value="0.56" | 560 m || 
|-id=566 bgcolor=#E9E9E9
| 476566 ||  || — || September 2, 2008 || Kitt Peak || Spacewatch || critical || align=right data-sort-value="0.62" | 620 m || 
|-id=567 bgcolor=#E9E9E9
| 476567 ||  || — || September 3, 2008 || Kitt Peak || Spacewatch || — || align=right data-sort-value="0.82" | 820 m || 
|-id=568 bgcolor=#E9E9E9
| 476568 ||  || — || September 3, 2008 || Kitt Peak || Spacewatch || — || align=right data-sort-value="0.96" | 960 m || 
|-id=569 bgcolor=#fefefe
| 476569 ||  || — || August 24, 2008 || Kitt Peak || Spacewatch || — || align=right data-sort-value="0.71" | 710 m || 
|-id=570 bgcolor=#E9E9E9
| 476570 ||  || — || September 4, 2008 || Socorro || LINEAR || — || align=right | 1.6 km || 
|-id=571 bgcolor=#E9E9E9
| 476571 ||  || — || September 2, 2008 || Kitt Peak || Spacewatch || — || align=right data-sort-value="0.66" | 660 m || 
|-id=572 bgcolor=#fefefe
| 476572 ||  || — || September 2, 2008 || Kitt Peak || Spacewatch || — || align=right | 1.2 km || 
|-id=573 bgcolor=#fefefe
| 476573 ||  || — || August 24, 2008 || Kitt Peak || Spacewatch || H || align=right data-sort-value="0.55" | 550 m || 
|-id=574 bgcolor=#E9E9E9
| 476574 ||  || — || September 2, 2008 || Kitt Peak || Spacewatch || — || align=right data-sort-value="0.87" | 870 m || 
|-id=575 bgcolor=#E9E9E9
| 476575 ||  || — || September 2, 2008 || Kitt Peak || Spacewatch || — || align=right | 1.3 km || 
|-id=576 bgcolor=#fefefe
| 476576 ||  || — || September 2, 2008 || Kitt Peak || Spacewatch || — || align=right data-sort-value="0.65" | 650 m || 
|-id=577 bgcolor=#E9E9E9
| 476577 ||  || — || September 2, 2008 || Kitt Peak || Spacewatch || — || align=right | 1.4 km || 
|-id=578 bgcolor=#E9E9E9
| 476578 ||  || — || September 3, 2008 || Kitt Peak || Spacewatch || — || align=right data-sort-value="0.78" | 780 m || 
|-id=579 bgcolor=#fefefe
| 476579 ||  || — || September 7, 2004 || Kitt Peak || Spacewatch || — || align=right data-sort-value="0.71" | 710 m || 
|-id=580 bgcolor=#E9E9E9
| 476580 ||  || — || September 5, 2008 || Kitt Peak || Spacewatch || — || align=right | 1.0 km || 
|-id=581 bgcolor=#E9E9E9
| 476581 ||  || — || September 9, 2008 || Mount Lemmon || Mount Lemmon Survey || — || align=right | 1.0 km || 
|-id=582 bgcolor=#E9E9E9
| 476582 ||  || — || September 6, 2008 || Mount Lemmon || Mount Lemmon Survey || — || align=right data-sort-value="0.65" | 650 m || 
|-id=583 bgcolor=#E9E9E9
| 476583 ||  || — || September 6, 2008 || Mount Lemmon || Mount Lemmon Survey || — || align=right | 1.2 km || 
|-id=584 bgcolor=#E9E9E9
| 476584 ||  || — || September 5, 2008 || Kitt Peak || Spacewatch || EUN || align=right data-sort-value="0.93" | 930 m || 
|-id=585 bgcolor=#d6d6d6
| 476585 ||  || — || September 3, 2008 || Kitt Peak || Spacewatch || 3:2 || align=right | 4.6 km || 
|-id=586 bgcolor=#E9E9E9
| 476586 ||  || — || September 3, 2008 || Kitt Peak || Spacewatch || — || align=right data-sort-value="0.97" | 970 m || 
|-id=587 bgcolor=#E9E9E9
| 476587 ||  || — || September 5, 2008 || Kitt Peak || Spacewatch || — || align=right | 1.7 km || 
|-id=588 bgcolor=#E9E9E9
| 476588 ||  || — || September 6, 2008 || Mount Lemmon || Mount Lemmon Survey || (5) || align=right data-sort-value="0.64" | 640 m || 
|-id=589 bgcolor=#fefefe
| 476589 ||  || — || September 25, 2008 || Bergisch Gladbach || W. Bickel || H || align=right data-sort-value="0.50" | 500 m || 
|-id=590 bgcolor=#fefefe
| 476590 ||  || — || August 24, 2008 || Socorro || LINEAR || — || align=right data-sort-value="0.76" | 760 m || 
|-id=591 bgcolor=#fefefe
| 476591 ||  || — || August 7, 2008 || Kitt Peak || Spacewatch || — || align=right data-sort-value="0.75" | 750 m || 
|-id=592 bgcolor=#fefefe
| 476592 ||  || — || July 29, 2008 || Kitt Peak || Spacewatch || — || align=right data-sort-value="0.73" | 730 m || 
|-id=593 bgcolor=#fefefe
| 476593 ||  || — || September 6, 2008 || Mount Lemmon || Mount Lemmon Survey || — || align=right data-sort-value="0.79" | 790 m || 
|-id=594 bgcolor=#fefefe
| 476594 ||  || — || September 20, 2008 || Kitt Peak || Spacewatch || — || align=right data-sort-value="0.71" | 710 m || 
|-id=595 bgcolor=#E9E9E9
| 476595 ||  || — || September 20, 2008 || Kitt Peak || Spacewatch || — || align=right | 1.1 km || 
|-id=596 bgcolor=#E9E9E9
| 476596 ||  || — || September 20, 2008 || Mount Lemmon || Mount Lemmon Survey || critical || align=right data-sort-value="0.57" | 570 m || 
|-id=597 bgcolor=#E9E9E9
| 476597 ||  || — || September 20, 2008 || Mount Lemmon || Mount Lemmon Survey || — || align=right data-sort-value="0.72" | 720 m || 
|-id=598 bgcolor=#E9E9E9
| 476598 ||  || — || September 9, 2008 || Mount Lemmon || Mount Lemmon Survey || — || align=right data-sort-value="0.87" | 870 m || 
|-id=599 bgcolor=#E9E9E9
| 476599 ||  || — || September 23, 2008 || Kitt Peak || Spacewatch || — || align=right data-sort-value="0.56" | 560 m || 
|-id=600 bgcolor=#d6d6d6
| 476600 ||  || — || September 27, 2008 || Altschwendt || W. Ries || 3:2 || align=right | 3.7 km || 
|}

476601–476700 

|-bgcolor=#FFC2E0
| 476601 ||  || — || September 28, 2008 || Catalina || CSS || APOPHAcritical || align=right data-sort-value="0.39" | 390 m || 
|-id=602 bgcolor=#E9E9E9
| 476602 ||  || — || September 21, 2008 || Kitt Peak || Spacewatch || — || align=right | 1.1 km || 
|-id=603 bgcolor=#E9E9E9
| 476603 ||  || — || September 21, 2008 || Kitt Peak || Spacewatch || — || align=right | 1.1 km || 
|-id=604 bgcolor=#E9E9E9
| 476604 ||  || — || September 21, 2008 || Kitt Peak || Spacewatch || — || align=right data-sort-value="0.98" | 980 m || 
|-id=605 bgcolor=#d6d6d6
| 476605 ||  || — || September 22, 2008 || Kitt Peak || Spacewatch || 3:2 || align=right | 4.0 km || 
|-id=606 bgcolor=#E9E9E9
| 476606 ||  || — || September 22, 2008 || Mount Lemmon || Mount Lemmon Survey || — || align=right | 1.5 km || 
|-id=607 bgcolor=#E9E9E9
| 476607 ||  || — || September 22, 2008 || Mount Lemmon || Mount Lemmon Survey || MAR || align=right data-sort-value="0.80" | 800 m || 
|-id=608 bgcolor=#E9E9E9
| 476608 ||  || — || September 22, 2008 || Mount Lemmon || Mount Lemmon Survey || (5) || align=right data-sort-value="0.73" | 730 m || 
|-id=609 bgcolor=#E9E9E9
| 476609 ||  || — || September 22, 2008 || Kitt Peak || Spacewatch || (5) || align=right data-sort-value="0.62" | 620 m || 
|-id=610 bgcolor=#E9E9E9
| 476610 ||  || — || September 6, 2008 || Mount Lemmon || Mount Lemmon Survey || — || align=right | 1.2 km || 
|-id=611 bgcolor=#E9E9E9
| 476611 ||  || — || September 6, 2008 || Mount Lemmon || Mount Lemmon Survey || — || align=right | 1.3 km || 
|-id=612 bgcolor=#E9E9E9
| 476612 ||  || — || September 23, 2008 || Kitt Peak || Spacewatch || critical || align=right data-sort-value="0.68" | 680 m || 
|-id=613 bgcolor=#E9E9E9
| 476613 ||  || — || September 23, 2008 || Kitt Peak || Spacewatch || critical || align=right data-sort-value="0.57" | 570 m || 
|-id=614 bgcolor=#E9E9E9
| 476614 ||  || — || September 23, 2008 || Kitt Peak || Spacewatch || (5) || align=right data-sort-value="0.71" | 710 m || 
|-id=615 bgcolor=#E9E9E9
| 476615 ||  || — || September 24, 2008 || Mount Lemmon || Mount Lemmon Survey || — || align=right | 1.2 km || 
|-id=616 bgcolor=#E9E9E9
| 476616 ||  || — || September 24, 2008 || Mount Lemmon || Mount Lemmon Survey || — || align=right data-sort-value="0.76" | 760 m || 
|-id=617 bgcolor=#E9E9E9
| 476617 ||  || — || September 9, 2008 || Mount Lemmon || Mount Lemmon Survey || — || align=right | 1.5 km || 
|-id=618 bgcolor=#E9E9E9
| 476618 ||  || — || August 24, 2008 || Kitt Peak || Spacewatch || — || align=right | 1.1 km || 
|-id=619 bgcolor=#fefefe
| 476619 ||  || — || September 22, 2008 || Mount Lemmon || Mount Lemmon Survey || — || align=right data-sort-value="0.83" | 830 m || 
|-id=620 bgcolor=#fefefe
| 476620 ||  || — || September 24, 2008 || Socorro || LINEAR || NYS || align=right data-sort-value="0.64" | 640 m || 
|-id=621 bgcolor=#E9E9E9
| 476621 ||  || — || September 10, 2008 || Kitt Peak || Spacewatch || (5) || align=right data-sort-value="0.69" | 690 m || 
|-id=622 bgcolor=#fefefe
| 476622 ||  || — || September 3, 2008 || Kitt Peak || Spacewatch || NYS || align=right data-sort-value="0.71" | 710 m || 
|-id=623 bgcolor=#E9E9E9
| 476623 ||  || — || September 28, 2008 || Socorro || LINEAR || — || align=right data-sort-value="0.85" | 850 m || 
|-id=624 bgcolor=#E9E9E9
| 476624 ||  || — || September 24, 2008 || Mount Lemmon || Mount Lemmon Survey || — || align=right | 1.8 km || 
|-id=625 bgcolor=#d6d6d6
| 476625 ||  || — || September 25, 2008 || Kitt Peak || Spacewatch || 3:2 || align=right | 4.5 km || 
|-id=626 bgcolor=#E9E9E9
| 476626 ||  || — || September 25, 2008 || Kitt Peak || Spacewatch || — || align=right | 1.4 km || 
|-id=627 bgcolor=#E9E9E9
| 476627 ||  || — || September 25, 2008 || Kitt Peak || Spacewatch || — || align=right | 1.3 km || 
|-id=628 bgcolor=#E9E9E9
| 476628 ||  || — || September 25, 2008 || Kitt Peak || Spacewatch || KON || align=right | 1.9 km || 
|-id=629 bgcolor=#E9E9E9
| 476629 ||  || — || September 25, 2008 || Kitt Peak || Spacewatch || — || align=right data-sort-value="0.76" | 760 m || 
|-id=630 bgcolor=#E9E9E9
| 476630 ||  || — || September 26, 2008 || Kitt Peak || Spacewatch || — || align=right data-sort-value="0.86" | 860 m || 
|-id=631 bgcolor=#E9E9E9
| 476631 ||  || — || September 22, 2008 || Kitt Peak || Spacewatch || — || align=right data-sort-value="0.75" | 750 m || 
|-id=632 bgcolor=#d6d6d6
| 476632 ||  || — || August 24, 2008 || Kitt Peak || Spacewatch || 3:2 || align=right | 3.9 km || 
|-id=633 bgcolor=#E9E9E9
| 476633 ||  || — || September 29, 2008 || Kitt Peak || Spacewatch || — || align=right data-sort-value="0.81" | 810 m || 
|-id=634 bgcolor=#fefefe
| 476634 ||  || — || September 29, 2008 || Kitt Peak || Spacewatch || H || align=right data-sort-value="0.65" | 650 m || 
|-id=635 bgcolor=#E9E9E9
| 476635 ||  || — || September 4, 2008 || Kitt Peak || Spacewatch || — || align=right data-sort-value="0.82" | 820 m || 
|-id=636 bgcolor=#E9E9E9
| 476636 ||  || — || September 24, 2008 || Kitt Peak || Spacewatch || — || align=right data-sort-value="0.88" | 880 m || 
|-id=637 bgcolor=#E9E9E9
| 476637 ||  || — || September 24, 2008 || Kitt Peak || Spacewatch || — || align=right data-sort-value="0.62" | 620 m || 
|-id=638 bgcolor=#fefefe
| 476638 ||  || — || September 27, 2008 || Mount Lemmon || Mount Lemmon Survey || H || align=right data-sort-value="0.73" | 730 m || 
|-id=639 bgcolor=#E9E9E9
| 476639 ||  || — || September 21, 2008 || Kitt Peak || Spacewatch || (5) || align=right data-sort-value="0.59" | 590 m || 
|-id=640 bgcolor=#E9E9E9
| 476640 ||  || — || September 22, 2008 || Kitt Peak || Spacewatch || — || align=right data-sort-value="0.85" | 850 m || 
|-id=641 bgcolor=#E9E9E9
| 476641 ||  || — || September 22, 2008 || Mount Lemmon || Mount Lemmon Survey || — || align=right | 1.6 km || 
|-id=642 bgcolor=#d6d6d6
| 476642 ||  || — || September 22, 2008 || Mount Lemmon || Mount Lemmon Survey || 3:2 || align=right | 4.3 km || 
|-id=643 bgcolor=#E9E9E9
| 476643 ||  || — || September 23, 2008 || Catalina || CSS || — || align=right | 1.1 km || 
|-id=644 bgcolor=#E9E9E9
| 476644 ||  || — || September 25, 2008 || Kitt Peak || Spacewatch || — || align=right data-sort-value="0.57" | 570 m || 
|-id=645 bgcolor=#E9E9E9
| 476645 ||  || — || September 29, 2008 || Kitt Peak || Spacewatch || (5) || align=right data-sort-value="0.61" | 610 m || 
|-id=646 bgcolor=#E9E9E9
| 476646 ||  || — || September 22, 2008 || Kitt Peak || Spacewatch || critical || align=right data-sort-value="0.65" | 650 m || 
|-id=647 bgcolor=#E9E9E9
| 476647 ||  || — || September 24, 2008 || Kitt Peak || Spacewatch || — || align=right data-sort-value="0.74" | 740 m || 
|-id=648 bgcolor=#E9E9E9
| 476648 ||  || — || September 29, 2008 || Catalina || CSS || — || align=right data-sort-value="0.97" | 970 m || 
|-id=649 bgcolor=#E9E9E9
| 476649 ||  || — || September 23, 2008 || Mount Lemmon || Mount Lemmon Survey || — || align=right data-sort-value="0.75" | 750 m || 
|-id=650 bgcolor=#E9E9E9
| 476650 ||  || — || September 29, 2008 || Mount Lemmon || Mount Lemmon Survey || — || align=right data-sort-value="0.74" | 740 m || 
|-id=651 bgcolor=#E9E9E9
| 476651 ||  || — || September 29, 2008 || Mount Lemmon || Mount Lemmon Survey || — || align=right | 1.2 km || 
|-id=652 bgcolor=#E9E9E9
| 476652 ||  || — || September 22, 2008 || Mount Lemmon || Mount Lemmon Survey || RAFcritical || align=right data-sort-value="0.67" | 670 m || 
|-id=653 bgcolor=#E9E9E9
| 476653 ||  || — || September 23, 2008 || Mount Lemmon || Mount Lemmon Survey || — || align=right data-sort-value="0.66" | 660 m || 
|-id=654 bgcolor=#E9E9E9
| 476654 ||  || — || September 24, 2008 || Kitt Peak || Spacewatch || — || align=right | 1.0 km || 
|-id=655 bgcolor=#E9E9E9
| 476655 ||  || — || September 23, 2008 || Kitt Peak || Spacewatch || — || align=right data-sort-value="0.69" | 690 m || 
|-id=656 bgcolor=#E9E9E9
| 476656 ||  || — || September 29, 2008 || Kitt Peak || Spacewatch || — || align=right | 1.3 km || 
|-id=657 bgcolor=#E9E9E9
| 476657 ||  || — || September 22, 2008 || Kitt Peak || Spacewatch || (5) || align=right data-sort-value="0.70" | 700 m || 
|-id=658 bgcolor=#E9E9E9
| 476658 ||  || — || September 24, 2008 || Catalina || CSS || — || align=right | 1.2 km || 
|-id=659 bgcolor=#fefefe
| 476659 ||  || — || September 28, 2008 || Mount Lemmon || Mount Lemmon Survey || H || align=right data-sort-value="0.67" | 670 m || 
|-id=660 bgcolor=#E9E9E9
| 476660 ||  || — || September 29, 2008 || Mount Lemmon || Mount Lemmon Survey || — || align=right | 1.0 km || 
|-id=661 bgcolor=#E9E9E9
| 476661 ||  || — || October 4, 2008 || La Sagra || OAM Obs. || critical || align=right data-sort-value="0.68" | 680 m || 
|-id=662 bgcolor=#E9E9E9
| 476662 ||  || — || October 4, 2008 || La Sagra || OAM Obs. || — || align=right data-sort-value="0.85" | 850 m || 
|-id=663 bgcolor=#E9E9E9
| 476663 ||  || — || September 7, 2008 || Mount Lemmon || Mount Lemmon Survey || — || align=right | 1.3 km || 
|-id=664 bgcolor=#E9E9E9
| 476664 ||  || — || October 1, 2008 || Mount Lemmon || Mount Lemmon Survey || (5) || align=right data-sort-value="0.55" | 550 m || 
|-id=665 bgcolor=#E9E9E9
| 476665 ||  || — || September 22, 2008 || Mount Lemmon || Mount Lemmon Survey || (5) || align=right data-sort-value="0.53" | 530 m || 
|-id=666 bgcolor=#E9E9E9
| 476666 ||  || — || October 1, 2008 || Mount Lemmon || Mount Lemmon Survey || — || align=right data-sort-value="0.79" | 790 m || 
|-id=667 bgcolor=#E9E9E9
| 476667 ||  || — || September 24, 2008 || Kitt Peak || Spacewatch || — || align=right data-sort-value="0.68" | 680 m || 
|-id=668 bgcolor=#E9E9E9
| 476668 ||  || — || October 1, 2008 || Kitt Peak || Spacewatch || (5) || align=right data-sort-value="0.58" | 580 m || 
|-id=669 bgcolor=#E9E9E9
| 476669 ||  || — || February 3, 2006 || Kitt Peak || Spacewatch || — || align=right | 1.4 km || 
|-id=670 bgcolor=#E9E9E9
| 476670 ||  || — || October 1, 2008 || Mount Lemmon || Mount Lemmon Survey || — || align=right data-sort-value="0.81" | 810 m || 
|-id=671 bgcolor=#E9E9E9
| 476671 ||  || — || September 21, 2008 || Kitt Peak || Spacewatch || — || align=right | 1.0 km || 
|-id=672 bgcolor=#E9E9E9
| 476672 ||  || — || October 1, 2008 || Kitt Peak || Spacewatch || — || align=right | 1.5 km || 
|-id=673 bgcolor=#E9E9E9
| 476673 ||  || — || October 1, 2008 || Mount Lemmon || Mount Lemmon Survey || — || align=right data-sort-value="0.81" | 810 m || 
|-id=674 bgcolor=#E9E9E9
| 476674 ||  || — || October 1, 2008 || Kitt Peak || Spacewatch || — || align=right data-sort-value="0.87" | 870 m || 
|-id=675 bgcolor=#E9E9E9
| 476675 ||  || — || October 2, 2008 || Kitt Peak || Spacewatch || — || align=right data-sort-value="0.75" | 750 m || 
|-id=676 bgcolor=#d6d6d6
| 476676 ||  || — || October 2, 2008 || Kitt Peak || Spacewatch || SHU3:2 || align=right | 4.6 km || 
|-id=677 bgcolor=#d6d6d6
| 476677 ||  || — || October 2, 2008 || Kitt Peak || Spacewatch || SHU3:2 || align=right | 4.4 km || 
|-id=678 bgcolor=#E9E9E9
| 476678 ||  || — || September 24, 2008 || Kitt Peak || Spacewatch || — || align=right | 1.2 km || 
|-id=679 bgcolor=#d6d6d6
| 476679 ||  || — || September 22, 2008 || Mount Lemmon || Mount Lemmon Survey || 3:2 || align=right | 4.0 km || 
|-id=680 bgcolor=#E9E9E9
| 476680 ||  || — || October 2, 2008 || Kitt Peak || Spacewatch || (5) || align=right data-sort-value="0.70" | 700 m || 
|-id=681 bgcolor=#E9E9E9
| 476681 ||  || — || October 2, 2008 || Kitt Peak || Spacewatch || — || align=right data-sort-value="0.87" | 870 m || 
|-id=682 bgcolor=#E9E9E9
| 476682 ||  || — || October 2, 2008 || Kitt Peak || Spacewatch || — || align=right data-sort-value="0.82" | 820 m || 
|-id=683 bgcolor=#E9E9E9
| 476683 ||  || — || October 2, 2008 || Kitt Peak || Spacewatch || — || align=right data-sort-value="0.72" | 720 m || 
|-id=684 bgcolor=#E9E9E9
| 476684 ||  || — || September 24, 2008 || Kitt Peak || Spacewatch || — || align=right data-sort-value="0.68" | 680 m || 
|-id=685 bgcolor=#E9E9E9
| 476685 ||  || — || September 24, 2008 || Kitt Peak || Spacewatch || KON || align=right | 2.3 km || 
|-id=686 bgcolor=#fefefe
| 476686 ||  || — || October 3, 2008 || Mount Lemmon || Mount Lemmon Survey || — || align=right data-sort-value="0.79" | 790 m || 
|-id=687 bgcolor=#E9E9E9
| 476687 ||  || — || October 3, 2008 || Mount Lemmon || Mount Lemmon Survey || (5) || align=right data-sort-value="0.68" | 680 m || 
|-id=688 bgcolor=#E9E9E9
| 476688 ||  || — || October 6, 2008 || Kitt Peak || Spacewatch || — || align=right data-sort-value="0.86" | 860 m || 
|-id=689 bgcolor=#E9E9E9
| 476689 ||  || — || October 6, 2008 || Kitt Peak || Spacewatch || (5) || align=right data-sort-value="0.48" | 480 m || 
|-id=690 bgcolor=#E9E9E9
| 476690 ||  || — || October 6, 2008 || Kitt Peak || Spacewatch || — || align=right | 1.1 km || 
|-id=691 bgcolor=#E9E9E9
| 476691 ||  || — || October 6, 2008 || Kitt Peak || Spacewatch || — || align=right data-sort-value="0.71" | 710 m || 
|-id=692 bgcolor=#E9E9E9
| 476692 ||  || — || October 6, 2008 || Kitt Peak || Spacewatch || — || align=right | 1.2 km || 
|-id=693 bgcolor=#E9E9E9
| 476693 ||  || — || October 6, 2008 || Kitt Peak || Spacewatch || — || align=right | 1.3 km || 
|-id=694 bgcolor=#E9E9E9
| 476694 ||  || — || October 6, 2008 || Kitt Peak || Spacewatch || critical || align=right data-sort-value="0.62" | 620 m || 
|-id=695 bgcolor=#E9E9E9
| 476695 ||  || — || October 6, 2008 || Mount Lemmon || Mount Lemmon Survey || — || align=right | 1.2 km || 
|-id=696 bgcolor=#E9E9E9
| 476696 ||  || — || September 5, 2008 || Kitt Peak || Spacewatch || RAF || align=right data-sort-value="0.85" | 850 m || 
|-id=697 bgcolor=#E9E9E9
| 476697 ||  || — || October 7, 2008 || Kitt Peak || Spacewatch || — || align=right data-sort-value="0.82" | 820 m || 
|-id=698 bgcolor=#E9E9E9
| 476698 ||  || — || October 8, 2008 || Mount Lemmon || Mount Lemmon Survey || — || align=right | 1.1 km || 
|-id=699 bgcolor=#E9E9E9
| 476699 ||  || — || October 8, 2008 || Mount Lemmon || Mount Lemmon Survey || — || align=right data-sort-value="0.73" | 730 m || 
|-id=700 bgcolor=#E9E9E9
| 476700 ||  || — || October 8, 2008 || Mount Lemmon || Mount Lemmon Survey || — || align=right data-sort-value="0.92" | 920 m || 
|}

476701–476800 

|-bgcolor=#fefefe
| 476701 ||  || — || September 23, 2008 || Kitt Peak || Spacewatch || — || align=right data-sort-value="0.97" | 970 m || 
|-id=702 bgcolor=#d6d6d6
| 476702 ||  || — || October 8, 2008 || Kitt Peak || Spacewatch || SHU3:2 || align=right | 5.8 km || 
|-id=703 bgcolor=#d6d6d6
| 476703 ||  || — || October 9, 2008 || Mount Lemmon || Mount Lemmon Survey || SHU3:2 || align=right | 3.9 km || 
|-id=704 bgcolor=#E9E9E9
| 476704 ||  || — || September 2, 2008 || Kitt Peak || Spacewatch || — || align=right | 1.0 km || 
|-id=705 bgcolor=#E9E9E9
| 476705 ||  || — || October 9, 2008 || Mount Lemmon || Mount Lemmon Survey || — || align=right data-sort-value="0.56" | 560 m || 
|-id=706 bgcolor=#E9E9E9
| 476706 ||  || — || September 24, 2008 || Mount Lemmon || Mount Lemmon Survey || — || align=right | 1.0 km || 
|-id=707 bgcolor=#E9E9E9
| 476707 ||  || — || February 2, 2006 || Mount Lemmon || Mount Lemmon Survey || — || align=right data-sort-value="0.82" | 820 m || 
|-id=708 bgcolor=#E9E9E9
| 476708 ||  || — || October 2, 2008 || Kitt Peak || Spacewatch || (5) || align=right data-sort-value="0.55" | 550 m || 
|-id=709 bgcolor=#fefefe
| 476709 ||  || — || October 1, 2008 || Kitt Peak || Spacewatch || H || align=right data-sort-value="0.49" | 490 m || 
|-id=710 bgcolor=#E9E9E9
| 476710 ||  || — || October 6, 2008 || Mount Lemmon || Mount Lemmon Survey || — || align=right data-sort-value="0.95" | 950 m || 
|-id=711 bgcolor=#E9E9E9
| 476711 ||  || — || October 7, 2008 || Mount Lemmon || Mount Lemmon Survey || — || align=right data-sort-value="0.90" | 900 m || 
|-id=712 bgcolor=#E9E9E9
| 476712 ||  || — || October 3, 2008 || Mount Lemmon || Mount Lemmon Survey || — || align=right | 1.3 km || 
|-id=713 bgcolor=#E9E9E9
| 476713 ||  || — || October 9, 2008 || Catalina || CSS || MAR || align=right | 1.1 km || 
|-id=714 bgcolor=#E9E9E9
| 476714 ||  || — || October 1, 2008 || Kitt Peak || Spacewatch || — || align=right | 1.3 km || 
|-id=715 bgcolor=#fefefe
| 476715 ||  || — || October 2, 2008 || Socorro || LINEAR || — || align=right | 1.1 km || 
|-id=716 bgcolor=#E9E9E9
| 476716 ||  || — || October 6, 2008 || Catalina || CSS || — || align=right | 1.1 km || 
|-id=717 bgcolor=#E9E9E9
| 476717 ||  || — || October 7, 2008 || Socorro || LINEAR || — || align=right | 1.1 km || 
|-id=718 bgcolor=#E9E9E9
| 476718 ||  || — || October 7, 2008 || Catalina || CSS || — || align=right data-sort-value="0.84" | 840 m || 
|-id=719 bgcolor=#fefefe
| 476719 ||  || — || October 8, 2008 || Kitt Peak || Spacewatch || — || align=right data-sort-value="0.68" | 680 m || 
|-id=720 bgcolor=#fefefe
| 476720 ||  || — || October 22, 2008 || Bergisch Gladbach || W. Bickel || — || align=right data-sort-value="0.82" | 820 m || 
|-id=721 bgcolor=#E9E9E9
| 476721 ||  || — || September 24, 2008 || Mount Lemmon || Mount Lemmon Survey || — || align=right data-sort-value="0.82" | 820 m || 
|-id=722 bgcolor=#E9E9E9
| 476722 ||  || — || October 23, 2008 || Kitt Peak || Spacewatch || — || align=right data-sort-value="0.58" | 580 m || 
|-id=723 bgcolor=#E9E9E9
| 476723 ||  || — || September 23, 2008 || Kitt Peak || Spacewatch || — || align=right data-sort-value="0.79" | 790 m || 
|-id=724 bgcolor=#E9E9E9
| 476724 ||  || — || October 18, 2008 || Kitt Peak || Spacewatch || — || align=right data-sort-value="0.83" | 830 m || 
|-id=725 bgcolor=#d6d6d6
| 476725 ||  || — || October 19, 2008 || Kitt Peak || Spacewatch || 3:2 || align=right | 4.0 km || 
|-id=726 bgcolor=#E9E9E9
| 476726 ||  || — || September 22, 2008 || Kitt Peak || Spacewatch || MAR || align=right data-sort-value="0.91" | 910 m || 
|-id=727 bgcolor=#E9E9E9
| 476727 ||  || — || October 19, 2008 || Kitt Peak || Spacewatch || critical || align=right data-sort-value="0.68" | 680 m || 
|-id=728 bgcolor=#fefefe
| 476728 ||  || — || September 6, 2008 || Kitt Peak || Spacewatch || — || align=right data-sort-value="0.75" | 750 m || 
|-id=729 bgcolor=#E9E9E9
| 476729 ||  || — || September 22, 2008 || Mount Lemmon || Mount Lemmon Survey || — || align=right data-sort-value="0.88" | 880 m || 
|-id=730 bgcolor=#E9E9E9
| 476730 ||  || — || October 20, 2008 || Kitt Peak || Spacewatch || — || align=right data-sort-value="0.77" | 770 m || 
|-id=731 bgcolor=#d6d6d6
| 476731 ||  || — || October 20, 2008 || Kitt Peak || Spacewatch || Tj (2.97) || align=right | 3.5 km || 
|-id=732 bgcolor=#E9E9E9
| 476732 ||  || — || September 23, 2008 || Mount Lemmon || Mount Lemmon Survey || — || align=right data-sort-value="0.86" | 860 m || 
|-id=733 bgcolor=#E9E9E9
| 476733 ||  || — || October 20, 2008 || Mount Lemmon || Mount Lemmon Survey || (5)critical || align=right data-sort-value="0.59" | 590 m || 
|-id=734 bgcolor=#E9E9E9
| 476734 ||  || — || October 1, 2008 || Kitt Peak || Spacewatch || — || align=right data-sort-value="0.75" | 750 m || 
|-id=735 bgcolor=#E9E9E9
| 476735 ||  || — || September 24, 2008 || Kitt Peak || Spacewatch || — || align=right data-sort-value="0.79" | 790 m || 
|-id=736 bgcolor=#E9E9E9
| 476736 ||  || — || December 10, 2004 || Kitt Peak || Spacewatch || (5) || align=right data-sort-value="0.69" | 690 m || 
|-id=737 bgcolor=#E9E9E9
| 476737 ||  || — || October 20, 2008 || Mount Lemmon || Mount Lemmon Survey || — || align=right | 1.0 km || 
|-id=738 bgcolor=#E9E9E9
| 476738 ||  || — || October 20, 2008 || Kitt Peak || Spacewatch || — || align=right data-sort-value="0.72" | 720 m || 
|-id=739 bgcolor=#E9E9E9
| 476739 ||  || — || September 22, 2008 || Mount Lemmon || Mount Lemmon Survey || — || align=right | 1.3 km || 
|-id=740 bgcolor=#E9E9E9
| 476740 ||  || — || September 24, 2008 || Mount Lemmon || Mount Lemmon Survey || — || align=right data-sort-value="0.98" | 980 m || 
|-id=741 bgcolor=#E9E9E9
| 476741 ||  || — || September 24, 2008 || Mount Lemmon || Mount Lemmon Survey || — || align=right | 1.2 km || 
|-id=742 bgcolor=#E9E9E9
| 476742 ||  || — || October 20, 2008 || Mount Lemmon || Mount Lemmon Survey || — || align=right | 1.2 km || 
|-id=743 bgcolor=#E9E9E9
| 476743 ||  || — || October 20, 2008 || Kitt Peak || Spacewatch || — || align=right data-sort-value="0.67" | 670 m || 
|-id=744 bgcolor=#E9E9E9
| 476744 ||  || — || September 24, 2008 || Mount Lemmon || Mount Lemmon Survey || — || align=right | 1.4 km || 
|-id=745 bgcolor=#E9E9E9
| 476745 ||  || — || October 21, 2008 || Kitt Peak || Spacewatch || (5) || align=right data-sort-value="0.62" | 620 m || 
|-id=746 bgcolor=#d6d6d6
| 476746 ||  || — || October 6, 2008 || Kitt Peak || Spacewatch || 3:2 || align=right | 4.2 km || 
|-id=747 bgcolor=#E9E9E9
| 476747 ||  || — || September 26, 2008 || Kitt Peak || Spacewatch || — || align=right data-sort-value="0.66" | 660 m || 
|-id=748 bgcolor=#d6d6d6
| 476748 ||  || — || October 21, 2008 || Kitt Peak || Spacewatch || 3:2 || align=right | 5.2 km || 
|-id=749 bgcolor=#E9E9E9
| 476749 ||  || — || October 9, 2008 || Kitt Peak || Spacewatch || — || align=right data-sort-value="0.93" | 930 m || 
|-id=750 bgcolor=#E9E9E9
| 476750 ||  || — || September 28, 2008 || Mount Lemmon || Mount Lemmon Survey || — || align=right data-sort-value="0.72" | 720 m || 
|-id=751 bgcolor=#E9E9E9
| 476751 ||  || — || October 21, 2008 || Kitt Peak || Spacewatch || — || align=right data-sort-value="0.64" | 640 m || 
|-id=752 bgcolor=#E9E9E9
| 476752 ||  || — || September 28, 2008 || Mount Lemmon || Mount Lemmon Survey || — || align=right data-sort-value="0.51" | 510 m || 
|-id=753 bgcolor=#E9E9E9
| 476753 ||  || — || October 7, 2008 || Mount Lemmon || Mount Lemmon Survey || — || align=right data-sort-value="0.84" | 840 m || 
|-id=754 bgcolor=#E9E9E9
| 476754 ||  || — || October 21, 2008 || Kitt Peak || Spacewatch || — || align=right data-sort-value="0.86" | 860 m || 
|-id=755 bgcolor=#E9E9E9
| 476755 ||  || — || October 21, 2008 || Kitt Peak || Spacewatch || — || align=right | 1.8 km || 
|-id=756 bgcolor=#E9E9E9
| 476756 ||  || — || October 21, 2008 || Mount Lemmon || Mount Lemmon Survey || — || align=right | 1.1 km || 
|-id=757 bgcolor=#E9E9E9
| 476757 ||  || — || October 21, 2008 || Mount Lemmon || Mount Lemmon Survey || — || align=right data-sort-value="0.86" | 860 m || 
|-id=758 bgcolor=#E9E9E9
| 476758 ||  || — || September 23, 2008 || Catalina || CSS || — || align=right | 1.0 km || 
|-id=759 bgcolor=#E9E9E9
| 476759 ||  || — || October 21, 2008 || Kitt Peak || Spacewatch || — || align=right | 1.2 km || 
|-id=760 bgcolor=#E9E9E9
| 476760 ||  || — || October 21, 2008 || Kitt Peak || Spacewatch || — || align=right data-sort-value="0.80" | 800 m || 
|-id=761 bgcolor=#E9E9E9
| 476761 ||  || — || October 21, 2008 || Kitt Peak || Spacewatch || — || align=right | 1.3 km || 
|-id=762 bgcolor=#E9E9E9
| 476762 ||  || — || September 29, 2008 || Mount Lemmon || Mount Lemmon Survey || critical || align=right data-sort-value="0.78" | 780 m || 
|-id=763 bgcolor=#E9E9E9
| 476763 ||  || — || October 27, 2008 || Catalina || CSS || — || align=right | 1.8 km || 
|-id=764 bgcolor=#d6d6d6
| 476764 ||  || — || October 27, 2008 || Bisei SG Center || BATTeRS || 3:2 || align=right | 4.2 km || 
|-id=765 bgcolor=#E9E9E9
| 476765 ||  || — || October 21, 2008 || Kitt Peak || Spacewatch || — || align=right | 1.1 km || 
|-id=766 bgcolor=#E9E9E9
| 476766 ||  || — || October 22, 2008 || Kitt Peak || Spacewatch || — || align=right | 1.2 km || 
|-id=767 bgcolor=#E9E9E9
| 476767 ||  || — || October 22, 2008 || Kitt Peak || Spacewatch || — || align=right data-sort-value="0.94" | 940 m || 
|-id=768 bgcolor=#E9E9E9
| 476768 ||  || — || October 22, 2008 || Kitt Peak || Spacewatch || — || align=right data-sort-value="0.82" | 820 m || 
|-id=769 bgcolor=#E9E9E9
| 476769 ||  || — || October 9, 2008 || Kitt Peak || Spacewatch || — || align=right data-sort-value="0.52" | 520 m || 
|-id=770 bgcolor=#E9E9E9
| 476770 ||  || — || October 9, 2008 || Kitt Peak || Spacewatch || — || align=right data-sort-value="0.88" | 880 m || 
|-id=771 bgcolor=#E9E9E9
| 476771 ||  || — || October 22, 2008 || Kitt Peak || Spacewatch || BRG || align=right | 1.2 km || 
|-id=772 bgcolor=#E9E9E9
| 476772 ||  || — || October 22, 2008 || Kitt Peak || Spacewatch || — || align=right data-sort-value="0.93" | 930 m || 
|-id=773 bgcolor=#E9E9E9
| 476773 ||  || — || October 22, 2008 || Kitt Peak || Spacewatch || — || align=right | 1.5 km || 
|-id=774 bgcolor=#E9E9E9
| 476774 ||  || — || October 22, 2008 || Kitt Peak || Spacewatch || (5) || align=right data-sort-value="0.69" | 690 m || 
|-id=775 bgcolor=#E9E9E9
| 476775 ||  || — || October 22, 2008 || Kitt Peak || Spacewatch || (194) || align=right | 1.5 km || 
|-id=776 bgcolor=#E9E9E9
| 476776 ||  || — || October 22, 2008 || Kitt Peak || Spacewatch || — || align=right | 1.5 km || 
|-id=777 bgcolor=#E9E9E9
| 476777 ||  || — || October 4, 2008 || Mount Lemmon || Mount Lemmon Survey || — || align=right | 1.0 km || 
|-id=778 bgcolor=#E9E9E9
| 476778 ||  || — || October 22, 2008 || Kitt Peak || Spacewatch || — || align=right | 1.6 km || 
|-id=779 bgcolor=#E9E9E9
| 476779 ||  || — || October 7, 2008 || Mount Lemmon || Mount Lemmon Survey || — || align=right data-sort-value="0.80" | 800 m || 
|-id=780 bgcolor=#E9E9E9
| 476780 ||  || — || October 23, 2008 || Kitt Peak || Spacewatch || — || align=right data-sort-value="0.73" | 730 m || 
|-id=781 bgcolor=#E9E9E9
| 476781 ||  || — || October 23, 2008 || Kitt Peak || Spacewatch || — || align=right data-sort-value="0.89" | 890 m || 
|-id=782 bgcolor=#E9E9E9
| 476782 ||  || — || October 23, 2008 || Kitt Peak || Spacewatch || (5) || align=right data-sort-value="0.59" | 590 m || 
|-id=783 bgcolor=#E9E9E9
| 476783 ||  || — || October 6, 2008 || Kitt Peak || Spacewatch || KON || align=right | 2.0 km || 
|-id=784 bgcolor=#fefefe
| 476784 ||  || — || October 23, 2008 || Kitt Peak || Spacewatch || H || align=right data-sort-value="0.79" | 790 m || 
|-id=785 bgcolor=#E9E9E9
| 476785 ||  || — || September 23, 2008 || Mount Lemmon || Mount Lemmon Survey || — || align=right data-sort-value="0.90" | 900 m || 
|-id=786 bgcolor=#E9E9E9
| 476786 ||  || — || October 23, 2008 || Kitt Peak || Spacewatch || (5) || align=right data-sort-value="0.81" | 810 m || 
|-id=787 bgcolor=#E9E9E9
| 476787 ||  || — || October 23, 2008 || Kitt Peak || Spacewatch || — || align=right data-sort-value="0.86" | 860 m || 
|-id=788 bgcolor=#E9E9E9
| 476788 ||  || — || October 23, 2008 || Kitt Peak || Spacewatch || — || align=right data-sort-value="0.86" | 860 m || 
|-id=789 bgcolor=#E9E9E9
| 476789 ||  || — || September 24, 2008 || Kitt Peak || Spacewatch || — || align=right data-sort-value="0.82" | 820 m || 
|-id=790 bgcolor=#E9E9E9
| 476790 ||  || — || October 9, 2008 || Mount Lemmon || Mount Lemmon Survey || — || align=right | 1.7 km || 
|-id=791 bgcolor=#E9E9E9
| 476791 ||  || — || October 23, 2008 || Mount Lemmon || Mount Lemmon Survey || — || align=right data-sort-value="0.84" | 840 m || 
|-id=792 bgcolor=#E9E9E9
| 476792 ||  || — || October 9, 2008 || Mount Lemmon || Mount Lemmon Survey || — || align=right | 1.6 km || 
|-id=793 bgcolor=#E9E9E9
| 476793 ||  || — || October 23, 2008 || Mount Lemmon || Mount Lemmon Survey || — || align=right data-sort-value="0.75" | 750 m || 
|-id=794 bgcolor=#E9E9E9
| 476794 ||  || — || October 23, 2008 || Kitt Peak || Spacewatch || — || align=right | 1.1 km || 
|-id=795 bgcolor=#E9E9E9
| 476795 ||  || — || October 23, 2008 || Kitt Peak || Spacewatch || KON || align=right | 2.0 km || 
|-id=796 bgcolor=#E9E9E9
| 476796 ||  || — || October 24, 2008 || Kitt Peak || Spacewatch || — || align=right data-sort-value="0.92" | 920 m || 
|-id=797 bgcolor=#E9E9E9
| 476797 ||  || — || October 10, 2008 || Mount Lemmon || Mount Lemmon Survey || — || align=right data-sort-value="0.92" | 920 m || 
|-id=798 bgcolor=#E9E9E9
| 476798 ||  || — || October 10, 2008 || Mount Lemmon || Mount Lemmon Survey || — || align=right data-sort-value="0.67" | 670 m || 
|-id=799 bgcolor=#E9E9E9
| 476799 ||  || — || October 10, 2008 || Mount Lemmon || Mount Lemmon Survey || critical || align=right data-sort-value="0.65" | 650 m || 
|-id=800 bgcolor=#E9E9E9
| 476800 ||  || — || October 24, 2008 || Kitt Peak || Spacewatch || — || align=right | 1.5 km || 
|}

476801–476900 

|-bgcolor=#E9E9E9
| 476801 ||  || — || October 24, 2008 || Kitt Peak || Spacewatch || — || align=right data-sort-value="0.65" | 650 m || 
|-id=802 bgcolor=#E9E9E9
| 476802 ||  || — || October 24, 2008 || Kitt Peak || Spacewatch || — || align=right data-sort-value="0.77" | 770 m || 
|-id=803 bgcolor=#E9E9E9
| 476803 ||  || — || October 24, 2008 || Kitt Peak || Spacewatch || critical || align=right data-sort-value="0.54" | 540 m || 
|-id=804 bgcolor=#E9E9E9
| 476804 ||  || — || October 24, 2008 || Catalina || CSS || — || align=right | 1.2 km || 
|-id=805 bgcolor=#d6d6d6
| 476805 ||  || — || October 24, 2008 || Mount Lemmon || Mount Lemmon Survey || 3:2 || align=right | 4.3 km || 
|-id=806 bgcolor=#E9E9E9
| 476806 ||  || — || October 24, 2008 || Kitt Peak || Spacewatch || — || align=right | 1.2 km || 
|-id=807 bgcolor=#FA8072
| 476807 ||  || — || October 24, 2008 || Kitt Peak || Spacewatch || — || align=right | 1.1 km || 
|-id=808 bgcolor=#fefefe
| 476808 ||  || — || October 25, 2008 || Mount Lemmon || Mount Lemmon Survey || NYS || align=right data-sort-value="0.48" | 480 m || 
|-id=809 bgcolor=#E9E9E9
| 476809 ||  || — || October 25, 2008 || Mount Lemmon || Mount Lemmon Survey || EUN || align=right | 1.1 km || 
|-id=810 bgcolor=#fefefe
| 476810 ||  || — || October 20, 2008 || Kitt Peak || Spacewatch || H || align=right data-sort-value="0.63" | 630 m || 
|-id=811 bgcolor=#E9E9E9
| 476811 ||  || — || May 9, 2007 || Kitt Peak || Spacewatch || — || align=right data-sort-value="0.82" | 820 m || 
|-id=812 bgcolor=#E9E9E9
| 476812 ||  || — || September 29, 2008 || Kitt Peak || Spacewatch || — || align=right data-sort-value="0.83" | 830 m || 
|-id=813 bgcolor=#fefefe
| 476813 ||  || — || October 31, 2008 || Magdalena Ridge || W. H. Ryan || H || align=right data-sort-value="0.43" | 430 m || 
|-id=814 bgcolor=#E9E9E9
| 476814 ||  || — || October 22, 2008 || Kitt Peak || Spacewatch || EUN || align=right | 1.2 km || 
|-id=815 bgcolor=#E9E9E9
| 476815 ||  || — || October 6, 2008 || Mount Lemmon || Mount Lemmon Survey || — || align=right data-sort-value="0.85" | 850 m || 
|-id=816 bgcolor=#E9E9E9
| 476816 ||  || — || October 2, 2008 || Kitt Peak || Spacewatch || — || align=right data-sort-value="0.73" | 730 m || 
|-id=817 bgcolor=#E9E9E9
| 476817 ||  || — || October 6, 2008 || Kitt Peak || Spacewatch || — || align=right data-sort-value="0.75" | 750 m || 
|-id=818 bgcolor=#E9E9E9
| 476818 ||  || — || October 25, 2008 || Kitt Peak || Spacewatch || — || align=right | 1.2 km || 
|-id=819 bgcolor=#E9E9E9
| 476819 ||  || — || October 26, 2008 || Kitt Peak || Spacewatch || BRG || align=right | 1.2 km || 
|-id=820 bgcolor=#E9E9E9
| 476820 ||  || — || October 26, 2008 || Kitt Peak || Spacewatch || — || align=right | 1.8 km || 
|-id=821 bgcolor=#E9E9E9
| 476821 ||  || — || October 26, 2008 || Kitt Peak || Spacewatch || critical || align=right | 2.6 km || 
|-id=822 bgcolor=#E9E9E9
| 476822 ||  || — || October 26, 2008 || Kitt Peak || Spacewatch || JUN || align=right | 1.3 km || 
|-id=823 bgcolor=#E9E9E9
| 476823 ||  || — || October 26, 2008 || Kitt Peak || Spacewatch || MAR || align=right | 1.1 km || 
|-id=824 bgcolor=#E9E9E9
| 476824 ||  || — || October 26, 2008 || Kitt Peak || Spacewatch || — || align=right data-sort-value="0.71" | 710 m || 
|-id=825 bgcolor=#E9E9E9
| 476825 ||  || — || September 22, 2008 || Mount Lemmon || Mount Lemmon Survey || EUN || align=right | 1.3 km || 
|-id=826 bgcolor=#E9E9E9
| 476826 ||  || — || October 9, 2008 || Mount Lemmon || Mount Lemmon Survey || — || align=right | 1.3 km || 
|-id=827 bgcolor=#E9E9E9
| 476827 ||  || — || October 27, 2008 || Kitt Peak || Spacewatch || — || align=right | 1.3 km || 
|-id=828 bgcolor=#E9E9E9
| 476828 ||  || — || October 28, 2008 || Kitt Peak || Spacewatch || — || align=right data-sort-value="0.94" | 940 m || 
|-id=829 bgcolor=#E9E9E9
| 476829 ||  || — || October 28, 2008 || Mount Lemmon || Mount Lemmon Survey || — || align=right | 1.3 km || 
|-id=830 bgcolor=#E9E9E9
| 476830 ||  || — || September 24, 2008 || Mount Lemmon || Mount Lemmon Survey || — || align=right data-sort-value="0.75" | 750 m || 
|-id=831 bgcolor=#E9E9E9
| 476831 ||  || — || September 29, 2008 || Kitt Peak || Spacewatch || — || align=right | 1.5 km || 
|-id=832 bgcolor=#E9E9E9
| 476832 ||  || — || October 28, 2008 || Kitt Peak || Spacewatch || — || align=right data-sort-value="0.51" | 510 m || 
|-id=833 bgcolor=#E9E9E9
| 476833 ||  || — || October 24, 2008 || Kitt Peak || Spacewatch || — || align=right | 1.2 km || 
|-id=834 bgcolor=#E9E9E9
| 476834 ||  || — || October 20, 2008 || Kitt Peak || Spacewatch || — || align=right data-sort-value="0.82" | 820 m || 
|-id=835 bgcolor=#E9E9E9
| 476835 ||  || — || September 29, 2008 || Kitt Peak || Spacewatch || (5) || align=right data-sort-value="0.67" | 670 m || 
|-id=836 bgcolor=#E9E9E9
| 476836 ||  || — || October 29, 2008 || Kitt Peak || Spacewatch || — || align=right data-sort-value="0.67" | 670 m || 
|-id=837 bgcolor=#E9E9E9
| 476837 ||  || — || October 29, 2008 || Kitt Peak || Spacewatch || — || align=right data-sort-value="0.80" | 800 m || 
|-id=838 bgcolor=#E9E9E9
| 476838 ||  || — || October 29, 2008 || Kitt Peak || Spacewatch || — || align=right data-sort-value="0.93" | 930 m || 
|-id=839 bgcolor=#E9E9E9
| 476839 ||  || — || October 29, 2008 || Kitt Peak || Spacewatch || (5) || align=right data-sort-value="0.85" | 850 m || 
|-id=840 bgcolor=#E9E9E9
| 476840 ||  || — || October 29, 2008 || Kitt Peak || Spacewatch || — || align=right | 1.3 km || 
|-id=841 bgcolor=#E9E9E9
| 476841 ||  || — || October 29, 2008 || Kitt Peak || Spacewatch || — || align=right data-sort-value="0.90" | 900 m || 
|-id=842 bgcolor=#fefefe
| 476842 ||  || — || October 29, 2008 || Kitt Peak || Spacewatch || — || align=right data-sort-value="0.70" | 700 m || 
|-id=843 bgcolor=#E9E9E9
| 476843 ||  || — || October 29, 2008 || Kitt Peak || Spacewatch || — || align=right data-sort-value="0.82" | 820 m || 
|-id=844 bgcolor=#E9E9E9
| 476844 ||  || — || October 30, 2008 || Kitt Peak || Spacewatch || — || align=right | 1.1 km || 
|-id=845 bgcolor=#E9E9E9
| 476845 ||  || — || September 25, 2008 || Mount Lemmon || Mount Lemmon Survey || MAR || align=right | 1.0 km || 
|-id=846 bgcolor=#E9E9E9
| 476846 ||  || — || October 30, 2008 || Kitt Peak || Spacewatch || — || align=right | 1.1 km || 
|-id=847 bgcolor=#E9E9E9
| 476847 ||  || — || October 30, 2008 || Kitt Peak || Spacewatch || — || align=right | 2.4 km || 
|-id=848 bgcolor=#E9E9E9
| 476848 ||  || — || October 31, 2008 || Mount Lemmon || Mount Lemmon Survey || EUN || align=right data-sort-value="0.67" | 670 m || 
|-id=849 bgcolor=#E9E9E9
| 476849 ||  || — || October 8, 2008 || Mount Lemmon || Mount Lemmon Survey || — || align=right data-sort-value="0.95" | 950 m || 
|-id=850 bgcolor=#E9E9E9
| 476850 ||  || — || December 2, 2004 || Kitt Peak || Spacewatch || critical || align=right data-sort-value="0.68" | 680 m || 
|-id=851 bgcolor=#E9E9E9
| 476851 ||  || — || October 10, 2008 || Catalina || CSS || — || align=right | 1.2 km || 
|-id=852 bgcolor=#E9E9E9
| 476852 ||  || — || October 31, 2008 || Mount Lemmon || Mount Lemmon Survey || — || align=right | 1.2 km || 
|-id=853 bgcolor=#E9E9E9
| 476853 ||  || — || October 31, 2008 || Mount Lemmon || Mount Lemmon Survey || — || align=right | 2.6 km || 
|-id=854 bgcolor=#E9E9E9
| 476854 ||  || — || October 31, 2008 || Kitt Peak || Spacewatch || — || align=right data-sort-value="0.86" | 860 m || 
|-id=855 bgcolor=#E9E9E9
| 476855 ||  || — || October 20, 2008 || Mount Lemmon || Mount Lemmon Survey || (5) || align=right data-sort-value="0.64" | 640 m || 
|-id=856 bgcolor=#E9E9E9
| 476856 ||  || — || October 20, 2008 || Kitt Peak || Spacewatch || — || align=right | 1.7 km || 
|-id=857 bgcolor=#E9E9E9
| 476857 ||  || — || October 20, 2008 || Kitt Peak || Spacewatch || — || align=right data-sort-value="0.88" | 880 m || 
|-id=858 bgcolor=#E9E9E9
| 476858 ||  || — || October 23, 2008 || Kitt Peak || Spacewatch || — || align=right data-sort-value="0.93" | 930 m || 
|-id=859 bgcolor=#E9E9E9
| 476859 ||  || — || October 26, 2008 || Kitt Peak || Spacewatch || — || align=right data-sort-value="0.96" | 960 m || 
|-id=860 bgcolor=#E9E9E9
| 476860 ||  || — || October 30, 2008 || Kitt Peak || Spacewatch || JUN || align=right data-sort-value="0.99" | 990 m || 
|-id=861 bgcolor=#E9E9E9
| 476861 ||  || — || April 21, 2006 || Kitt Peak || Spacewatch || MAR || align=right | 1.0 km || 
|-id=862 bgcolor=#E9E9E9
| 476862 ||  || — || October 30, 2008 || Catalina || CSS || — || align=right | 1.1 km || 
|-id=863 bgcolor=#E9E9E9
| 476863 ||  || — || October 29, 2008 || Kitt Peak || Spacewatch || (5) || align=right data-sort-value="0.69" | 690 m || 
|-id=864 bgcolor=#E9E9E9
| 476864 ||  || — || October 20, 2008 || Mount Lemmon || Mount Lemmon Survey || — || align=right | 1.1 km || 
|-id=865 bgcolor=#fefefe
| 476865 ||  || — || October 31, 2008 || Catalina || CSS || H || align=right data-sort-value="0.72" | 720 m || 
|-id=866 bgcolor=#E9E9E9
| 476866 ||  || — || October 24, 2008 || Socorro || LINEAR || — || align=right | 1.9 km || 
|-id=867 bgcolor=#E9E9E9
| 476867 ||  || — || November 6, 2008 || Cordell-Lorenz || Cordell–Lorenz Obs. || (5) || align=right data-sort-value="0.82" | 820 m || 
|-id=868 bgcolor=#E9E9E9
| 476868 ||  || — || October 22, 2008 || Kitt Peak || Spacewatch || — || align=right data-sort-value="0.91" | 910 m || 
|-id=869 bgcolor=#E9E9E9
| 476869 ||  || — || September 27, 2008 || Mount Lemmon || Mount Lemmon Survey || — || align=right data-sort-value="0.81" | 810 m || 
|-id=870 bgcolor=#E9E9E9
| 476870 ||  || — || October 25, 2008 || Catalina || CSS || — || align=right data-sort-value="0.86" | 860 m || 
|-id=871 bgcolor=#E9E9E9
| 476871 ||  || — || October 1, 2008 || Kitt Peak || Spacewatch || — || align=right data-sort-value="0.82" | 820 m || 
|-id=872 bgcolor=#E9E9E9
| 476872 ||  || — || November 1, 2008 || Mount Lemmon || Mount Lemmon Survey || MAR || align=right data-sort-value="0.75" | 750 m || 
|-id=873 bgcolor=#E9E9E9
| 476873 ||  || — || September 29, 2008 || Mount Lemmon || Mount Lemmon Survey || fast? || align=right data-sort-value="0.92" | 920 m || 
|-id=874 bgcolor=#E9E9E9
| 476874 ||  || — || November 1, 2008 || Kitt Peak || Spacewatch || — || align=right data-sort-value="0.65" | 650 m || 
|-id=875 bgcolor=#E9E9E9
| 476875 ||  || — || September 29, 2008 || Mount Lemmon || Mount Lemmon Survey || — || align=right data-sort-value="0.77" | 770 m || 
|-id=876 bgcolor=#E9E9E9
| 476876 ||  || — || October 21, 2008 || Kitt Peak || Spacewatch || (5) || align=right data-sort-value="0.78" | 780 m || 
|-id=877 bgcolor=#E9E9E9
| 476877 ||  || — || November 2, 2008 || Kitt Peak || Spacewatch || — || align=right data-sort-value="0.91" | 910 m || 
|-id=878 bgcolor=#E9E9E9
| 476878 ||  || — || November 2, 2008 || Mount Lemmon || Mount Lemmon Survey || — || align=right | 1.4 km || 
|-id=879 bgcolor=#E9E9E9
| 476879 ||  || — || October 4, 2008 || Mount Lemmon || Mount Lemmon Survey || — || align=right | 1.3 km || 
|-id=880 bgcolor=#E9E9E9
| 476880 ||  || — || November 3, 2008 || Kitt Peak || Spacewatch || — || align=right data-sort-value="0.69" | 690 m || 
|-id=881 bgcolor=#E9E9E9
| 476881 ||  || — || November 3, 2008 || Kitt Peak || Spacewatch || — || align=right | 2.6 km || 
|-id=882 bgcolor=#E9E9E9
| 476882 ||  || — || October 9, 2008 || Mount Lemmon || Mount Lemmon Survey || — || align=right | 1.8 km || 
|-id=883 bgcolor=#E9E9E9
| 476883 ||  || — || October 24, 2008 || Kitt Peak || Spacewatch || — || align=right data-sort-value="0.71" | 710 m || 
|-id=884 bgcolor=#E9E9E9
| 476884 ||  || — || September 6, 2008 || Mount Lemmon || Mount Lemmon Survey || — || align=right data-sort-value="0.95" | 950 m || 
|-id=885 bgcolor=#E9E9E9
| 476885 ||  || — || October 27, 2008 || Kitt Peak || Spacewatch || — || align=right data-sort-value="0.78" | 780 m || 
|-id=886 bgcolor=#E9E9E9
| 476886 ||  || — || November 6, 2008 || Mount Lemmon || Mount Lemmon Survey || — || align=right | 1.3 km || 
|-id=887 bgcolor=#E9E9E9
| 476887 ||  || — || November 9, 2008 || Mount Lemmon || Mount Lemmon Survey || (5) || align=right data-sort-value="0.98" | 980 m || 
|-id=888 bgcolor=#E9E9E9
| 476888 ||  || — || November 7, 2008 || Mount Lemmon || Mount Lemmon Survey || — || align=right data-sort-value="0.89" | 890 m || 
|-id=889 bgcolor=#E9E9E9
| 476889 ||  || — || November 8, 2008 || Kitt Peak || Spacewatch || KON || align=right | 1.9 km || 
|-id=890 bgcolor=#E9E9E9
| 476890 ||  || — || November 7, 2008 || Mount Lemmon || Mount Lemmon Survey || MAR || align=right | 1.1 km || 
|-id=891 bgcolor=#E9E9E9
| 476891 ||  || — || November 7, 2008 || Mount Lemmon || Mount Lemmon Survey || — || align=right data-sort-value="0.94" | 940 m || 
|-id=892 bgcolor=#E9E9E9
| 476892 ||  || — || October 20, 2008 || Kitt Peak || Spacewatch || — || align=right | 1.3 km || 
|-id=893 bgcolor=#E9E9E9
| 476893 ||  || — || November 7, 2008 || Mount Lemmon || Mount Lemmon Survey || — || align=right | 1.3 km || 
|-id=894 bgcolor=#E9E9E9
| 476894 ||  || — || October 25, 2008 || Kitt Peak || Spacewatch || — || align=right | 1.6 km || 
|-id=895 bgcolor=#E9E9E9
| 476895 ||  || — || November 18, 2008 || Catalina || CSS || — || align=right data-sort-value="0.91" | 910 m || 
|-id=896 bgcolor=#E9E9E9
| 476896 ||  || — || October 31, 2008 || Kitt Peak || Spacewatch || — || align=right | 1.0 km || 
|-id=897 bgcolor=#E9E9E9
| 476897 ||  || — || October 28, 2008 || Kitt Peak || Spacewatch || — || align=right data-sort-value="0.91" | 910 m || 
|-id=898 bgcolor=#E9E9E9
| 476898 ||  || — || November 17, 2008 || Kitt Peak || Spacewatch || — || align=right data-sort-value="0.88" | 880 m || 
|-id=899 bgcolor=#d6d6d6
| 476899 ||  || — || November 18, 2008 || Catalina || CSS || SHU3:2 || align=right | 5.9 km || 
|-id=900 bgcolor=#d6d6d6
| 476900 ||  || — || October 31, 2008 || Kitt Peak || Spacewatch || 3:2 || align=right | 3.9 km || 
|}

476901–477000 

|-bgcolor=#E9E9E9
| 476901 ||  || — || November 19, 2008 || Mount Lemmon || Mount Lemmon Survey || — || align=right | 3.3 km || 
|-id=902 bgcolor=#E9E9E9
| 476902 ||  || — || November 19, 2008 || Mount Lemmon || Mount Lemmon Survey || — || align=right | 1.0 km || 
|-id=903 bgcolor=#E9E9E9
| 476903 ||  || — || November 19, 2008 || Mount Lemmon || Mount Lemmon Survey || (5) || align=right data-sort-value="0.70" | 700 m || 
|-id=904 bgcolor=#FFC2E0
| 476904 ||  || — || November 21, 2008 || Kitt Peak || Spacewatch || APO || align=right data-sort-value="0.50" | 500 m || 
|-id=905 bgcolor=#fefefe
| 476905 ||  || — || October 7, 2008 || Mount Lemmon || Mount Lemmon Survey || H || align=right data-sort-value="0.76" | 760 m || 
|-id=906 bgcolor=#E9E9E9
| 476906 ||  || — || October 9, 2008 || Mount Lemmon || Mount Lemmon Survey || — || align=right data-sort-value="0.69" | 690 m || 
|-id=907 bgcolor=#E9E9E9
| 476907 ||  || — || October 23, 2008 || Mount Lemmon || Mount Lemmon Survey || — || align=right | 1.2 km || 
|-id=908 bgcolor=#E9E9E9
| 476908 ||  || — || November 17, 2008 || Kitt Peak || Spacewatch || — || align=right | 1.0 km || 
|-id=909 bgcolor=#E9E9E9
| 476909 ||  || — || September 27, 2008 || Mount Lemmon || Mount Lemmon Survey || (5) || align=right data-sort-value="0.75" | 750 m || 
|-id=910 bgcolor=#E9E9E9
| 476910 ||  || — || November 17, 2008 || Kitt Peak || Spacewatch || WIT || align=right data-sort-value="0.86" | 860 m || 
|-id=911 bgcolor=#E9E9E9
| 476911 ||  || — || October 26, 2008 || Kitt Peak || Spacewatch || — || align=right | 1.3 km || 
|-id=912 bgcolor=#E9E9E9
| 476912 ||  || — || October 22, 2008 || Kitt Peak || Spacewatch || — || align=right | 1.2 km || 
|-id=913 bgcolor=#E9E9E9
| 476913 ||  || — || September 9, 2008 || Mount Lemmon || Mount Lemmon Survey || — || align=right | 1.6 km || 
|-id=914 bgcolor=#fefefe
| 476914 ||  || — || November 23, 2008 || La Sagra || OAM Obs. || H || align=right data-sort-value="0.75" | 750 m || 
|-id=915 bgcolor=#E9E9E9
| 476915 ||  || — || November 20, 2008 || Socorro || LINEAR || — || align=right | 3.1 km || 
|-id=916 bgcolor=#E9E9E9
| 476916 ||  || — || November 19, 2008 || Mount Lemmon || Mount Lemmon Survey || — || align=right | 1.4 km || 
|-id=917 bgcolor=#E9E9E9
| 476917 ||  || — || November 19, 2008 || Mount Lemmon || Mount Lemmon Survey || — || align=right | 1.2 km || 
|-id=918 bgcolor=#E9E9E9
| 476918 ||  || — || November 19, 2008 || Kitt Peak || Spacewatch || (5) || align=right | 1.1 km || 
|-id=919 bgcolor=#E9E9E9
| 476919 ||  || — || November 20, 2008 || Kitt Peak || Spacewatch || fast? || align=right data-sort-value="0.99" | 990 m || 
|-id=920 bgcolor=#E9E9E9
| 476920 ||  || — || September 29, 2008 || Mount Lemmon || Mount Lemmon Survey || (5) || align=right data-sort-value="0.85" | 850 m || 
|-id=921 bgcolor=#E9E9E9
| 476921 ||  || — || October 21, 2008 || Kitt Peak || Spacewatch || KON || align=right | 2.3 km || 
|-id=922 bgcolor=#fefefe
| 476922 ||  || — || October 27, 2008 || Mount Lemmon || Mount Lemmon Survey || — || align=right data-sort-value="0.90" | 900 m || 
|-id=923 bgcolor=#E9E9E9
| 476923 ||  || — || September 27, 2008 || Mount Lemmon || Mount Lemmon Survey || (5) || align=right data-sort-value="0.87" | 870 m || 
|-id=924 bgcolor=#E9E9E9
| 476924 ||  || — || September 23, 2008 || Mount Lemmon || Mount Lemmon Survey || — || align=right data-sort-value="0.88" | 880 m || 
|-id=925 bgcolor=#E9E9E9
| 476925 ||  || — || November 21, 2008 || Kitt Peak || Spacewatch || — || align=right | 1.1 km || 
|-id=926 bgcolor=#E9E9E9
| 476926 ||  || — || November 30, 2008 || Kitt Peak || Spacewatch || (5)critical || align=right data-sort-value="0.61" | 610 m || 
|-id=927 bgcolor=#E9E9E9
| 476927 ||  || — || November 30, 2008 || Kitt Peak || Spacewatch || (5) || align=right data-sort-value="0.79" | 790 m || 
|-id=928 bgcolor=#E9E9E9
| 476928 ||  || — || November 30, 2008 || Mount Lemmon || Mount Lemmon Survey || — || align=right data-sort-value="0.86" | 860 m || 
|-id=929 bgcolor=#E9E9E9
| 476929 ||  || — || November 30, 2008 || Kitt Peak || Spacewatch || — || align=right | 1.3 km || 
|-id=930 bgcolor=#E9E9E9
| 476930 ||  || — || November 30, 2008 || Mount Lemmon || Mount Lemmon Survey || — || align=right | 1.2 km || 
|-id=931 bgcolor=#E9E9E9
| 476931 ||  || — || November 21, 2008 || Mount Lemmon || Mount Lemmon Survey || — || align=right | 1.9 km || 
|-id=932 bgcolor=#E9E9E9
| 476932 ||  || — || November 30, 2008 || Kitt Peak || Spacewatch || — || align=right | 1.2 km || 
|-id=933 bgcolor=#E9E9E9
| 476933 ||  || — || November 20, 2008 || Mount Lemmon || Mount Lemmon Survey || — || align=right data-sort-value="0.81" | 810 m || 
|-id=934 bgcolor=#E9E9E9
| 476934 ||  || — || November 22, 2008 || Kitt Peak || Spacewatch || — || align=right | 2.1 km || 
|-id=935 bgcolor=#E9E9E9
| 476935 ||  || — || November 30, 2008 || Kitt Peak || Spacewatch || — || align=right | 1.5 km || 
|-id=936 bgcolor=#E9E9E9
| 476936 ||  || — || November 18, 2008 || Kitt Peak || Spacewatch || — || align=right | 2.1 km || 
|-id=937 bgcolor=#E9E9E9
| 476937 ||  || — || November 17, 2008 || Catalina || CSS || — || align=right | 2.8 km || 
|-id=938 bgcolor=#E9E9E9
| 476938 ||  || — || November 21, 2008 || Socorro || LINEAR || RAF || align=right | 1.1 km || 
|-id=939 bgcolor=#E9E9E9
| 476939 ||  || — || November 30, 2008 || Kitt Peak || Spacewatch || — || align=right | 1.9 km || 
|-id=940 bgcolor=#E9E9E9
| 476940 ||  || — || November 30, 2008 || Socorro || LINEAR || — || align=right | 1.9 km || 
|-id=941 bgcolor=#E9E9E9
| 476941 ||  || — || November 18, 2008 || Kitt Peak || Spacewatch || — || align=right | 1.1 km || 
|-id=942 bgcolor=#E9E9E9
| 476942 ||  || — || October 20, 2008 || Kitt Peak || Spacewatch || — || align=right data-sort-value="0.93" | 930 m || 
|-id=943 bgcolor=#E9E9E9
| 476943 ||  || — || November 7, 2008 || Mount Lemmon || Mount Lemmon Survey || — || align=right data-sort-value="0.83" | 830 m || 
|-id=944 bgcolor=#E9E9E9
| 476944 ||  || — || November 30, 2008 || Mount Lemmon || Mount Lemmon Survey || — || align=right | 1.1 km || 
|-id=945 bgcolor=#E9E9E9
| 476945 ||  || — || December 3, 2008 || Marly || P. Kocher || — || align=right | 2.6 km || 
|-id=946 bgcolor=#E9E9E9
| 476946 ||  || — || November 18, 2008 || Catalina || CSS || — || align=right | 1.3 km || 
|-id=947 bgcolor=#E9E9E9
| 476947 ||  || — || October 30, 2008 || Kitt Peak || Spacewatch || — || align=right data-sort-value="0.91" | 910 m || 
|-id=948 bgcolor=#E9E9E9
| 476948 ||  || — || December 1, 2008 || Kitt Peak || Spacewatch || — || align=right data-sort-value="0.80" | 800 m || 
|-id=949 bgcolor=#E9E9E9
| 476949 ||  || — || December 1, 2008 || Kitt Peak || Spacewatch || — || align=right | 1.2 km || 
|-id=950 bgcolor=#E9E9E9
| 476950 ||  || — || October 30, 2008 || Kitt Peak || Spacewatch || — || align=right | 1.1 km || 
|-id=951 bgcolor=#E9E9E9
| 476951 ||  || — || October 25, 2008 || Kitt Peak || Spacewatch || — || align=right | 1.4 km || 
|-id=952 bgcolor=#E9E9E9
| 476952 ||  || — || October 29, 2008 || Kitt Peak || Spacewatch || — || align=right data-sort-value="0.94" | 940 m || 
|-id=953 bgcolor=#E9E9E9
| 476953 ||  || — || December 2, 2008 || Kitt Peak || Spacewatch || EUN || align=right | 1.1 km || 
|-id=954 bgcolor=#E9E9E9
| 476954 ||  || — || December 2, 2008 || Kitt Peak || Spacewatch || — || align=right | 1.9 km || 
|-id=955 bgcolor=#E9E9E9
| 476955 ||  || — || December 2, 2008 || Kitt Peak || Spacewatch || (5) || align=right data-sort-value="0.64" | 640 m || 
|-id=956 bgcolor=#E9E9E9
| 476956 ||  || — || November 20, 2008 || Kitt Peak || Spacewatch || — || align=right | 1.0 km || 
|-id=957 bgcolor=#E9E9E9
| 476957 ||  || — || December 2, 2008 || Mount Lemmon || Mount Lemmon Survey || — || align=right | 3.4 km || 
|-id=958 bgcolor=#E9E9E9
| 476958 ||  || — || December 2, 2008 || Kitt Peak || Spacewatch || — || align=right data-sort-value="0.84" | 840 m || 
|-id=959 bgcolor=#E9E9E9
| 476959 ||  || — || December 4, 2008 || Mount Lemmon || Mount Lemmon Survey || HOF || align=right | 2.5 km || 
|-id=960 bgcolor=#E9E9E9
| 476960 ||  || — || December 7, 2008 || Mount Lemmon || Mount Lemmon Survey || — || align=right | 2.8 km || 
|-id=961 bgcolor=#E9E9E9
| 476961 ||  || — || December 5, 2008 || Mount Lemmon || Mount Lemmon Survey || (5) || align=right | 1.1 km || 
|-id=962 bgcolor=#E9E9E9
| 476962 ||  || — || December 1, 2008 || Socorro || LINEAR || — || align=right data-sort-value="0.73" | 730 m || 
|-id=963 bgcolor=#E9E9E9
| 476963 ||  || — || December 1, 2008 || Mount Lemmon || Mount Lemmon Survey || (5) || align=right data-sort-value="0.99" | 990 m || 
|-id=964 bgcolor=#E9E9E9
| 476964 ||  || — || December 1, 2008 || Socorro || LINEAR || EUN || align=right | 1.5 km || 
|-id=965 bgcolor=#E9E9E9
| 476965 ||  || — || December 22, 2008 || Dauban || F. Kugel || EUN || align=right | 1.1 km || 
|-id=966 bgcolor=#E9E9E9
| 476966 ||  || — || December 22, 2008 || Dauban || F. Kugel || — || align=right | 2.1 km || 
|-id=967 bgcolor=#E9E9E9
| 476967 ||  || — || October 6, 2008 || Catalina || CSS || — || align=right | 1.9 km || 
|-id=968 bgcolor=#E9E9E9
| 476968 ||  || — || October 31, 2008 || Mount Lemmon || Mount Lemmon Survey || — || align=right | 1.6 km || 
|-id=969 bgcolor=#E9E9E9
| 476969 ||  || — || October 24, 2008 || Mount Lemmon || Mount Lemmon Survey || — || align=right | 1.7 km || 
|-id=970 bgcolor=#E9E9E9
| 476970 ||  || — || December 21, 2008 || Mount Lemmon || Mount Lemmon Survey || (5) || align=right data-sort-value="0.71" | 710 m || 
|-id=971 bgcolor=#E9E9E9
| 476971 ||  || — || November 24, 2008 || Mount Lemmon || Mount Lemmon Survey || JUN || align=right data-sort-value="0.91" | 910 m || 
|-id=972 bgcolor=#E9E9E9
| 476972 ||  || — || December 21, 2008 || Mount Lemmon || Mount Lemmon Survey || — || align=right | 1.3 km || 
|-id=973 bgcolor=#E9E9E9
| 476973 ||  || — || December 21, 2008 || Mount Lemmon || Mount Lemmon Survey || ADE || align=right | 2.2 km || 
|-id=974 bgcolor=#E9E9E9
| 476974 ||  || — || December 29, 2008 || Bergisch Gladbach || W. Bickel || EUN || align=right data-sort-value="0.98" | 980 m || 
|-id=975 bgcolor=#E9E9E9
| 476975 ||  || — || December 22, 2008 || Kitt Peak || Spacewatch || — || align=right | 2.0 km || 
|-id=976 bgcolor=#E9E9E9
| 476976 ||  || — || December 29, 2008 || Catalina || CSS || — || align=right | 1.6 km || 
|-id=977 bgcolor=#E9E9E9
| 476977 ||  || — || December 29, 2008 || Mount Lemmon || Mount Lemmon Survey || (5) || align=right data-sort-value="0.72" | 720 m || 
|-id=978 bgcolor=#d6d6d6
| 476978 ||  || — || December 29, 2008 || Mount Lemmon || Mount Lemmon Survey || — || align=right | 1.7 km || 
|-id=979 bgcolor=#E9E9E9
| 476979 ||  || — || December 29, 2008 || Mount Lemmon || Mount Lemmon Survey || — || align=right | 1.3 km || 
|-id=980 bgcolor=#E9E9E9
| 476980 ||  || — || December 29, 2008 || Mount Lemmon || Mount Lemmon Survey || — || align=right | 1.2 km || 
|-id=981 bgcolor=#E9E9E9
| 476981 ||  || — || December 29, 2008 || Mount Lemmon || Mount Lemmon Survey || (5) || align=right data-sort-value="0.68" | 680 m || 
|-id=982 bgcolor=#E9E9E9
| 476982 ||  || — || December 29, 2008 || Mount Lemmon || Mount Lemmon Survey || AGN || align=right | 1.0 km || 
|-id=983 bgcolor=#E9E9E9
| 476983 ||  || — || December 22, 2008 || Kitt Peak || Spacewatch || — || align=right | 1.2 km || 
|-id=984 bgcolor=#E9E9E9
| 476984 ||  || — || December 30, 2008 || Mount Lemmon || Mount Lemmon Survey || — || align=right | 2.0 km || 
|-id=985 bgcolor=#E9E9E9
| 476985 ||  || — || December 30, 2008 || Kitt Peak || Spacewatch || — || align=right | 1.8 km || 
|-id=986 bgcolor=#E9E9E9
| 476986 ||  || — || November 19, 2008 || Mount Lemmon || Mount Lemmon Survey || — || align=right | 1.0 km || 
|-id=987 bgcolor=#E9E9E9
| 476987 ||  || — || December 30, 2008 || Purple Mountain || PMO NEO || — || align=right | 2.7 km || 
|-id=988 bgcolor=#E9E9E9
| 476988 ||  || — || December 21, 2008 || Mount Lemmon || Mount Lemmon Survey || — || align=right | 1.7 km || 
|-id=989 bgcolor=#E9E9E9
| 476989 ||  || — || December 29, 2008 || Kitt Peak || Spacewatch || — || align=right | 1.6 km || 
|-id=990 bgcolor=#E9E9E9
| 476990 ||  || — || December 29, 2008 || Kitt Peak || Spacewatch || — || align=right | 1.3 km || 
|-id=991 bgcolor=#E9E9E9
| 476991 ||  || — || December 21, 2008 || Kitt Peak || Spacewatch || — || align=right | 2.0 km || 
|-id=992 bgcolor=#E9E9E9
| 476992 ||  || — || December 29, 2008 || Kitt Peak || Spacewatch || AGN || align=right | 1.0 km || 
|-id=993 bgcolor=#d6d6d6
| 476993 ||  || — || December 29, 2008 || Kitt Peak || Spacewatch || — || align=right | 2.2 km || 
|-id=994 bgcolor=#E9E9E9
| 476994 ||  || — || December 29, 2008 || Kitt Peak || Spacewatch || HOF || align=right | 2.6 km || 
|-id=995 bgcolor=#E9E9E9
| 476995 ||  || — || November 7, 2008 || Mount Lemmon || Mount Lemmon Survey || (5) || align=right data-sort-value="0.73" | 730 m || 
|-id=996 bgcolor=#E9E9E9
| 476996 ||  || — || December 31, 2008 || Kitt Peak || Spacewatch || — || align=right | 2.6 km || 
|-id=997 bgcolor=#E9E9E9
| 476997 ||  || — || December 29, 2008 || Kitt Peak || Spacewatch || MIS || align=right | 2.1 km || 
|-id=998 bgcolor=#E9E9E9
| 476998 ||  || — || December 22, 2008 || Kitt Peak || Spacewatch || — || align=right | 1.6 km || 
|-id=999 bgcolor=#E9E9E9
| 476999 ||  || — || December 30, 2008 || Kitt Peak || Spacewatch || — || align=right | 1.6 km || 
|-id=000 bgcolor=#E9E9E9
| 477000 ||  || — || December 30, 2008 || Kitt Peak || Spacewatch || — || align=right | 1.7 km || 
|}

References

External links 
 Discovery Circumstances: Numbered Minor Planets (475001)–(480000) (IAU Minor Planet Center)

0476